
This is an alphabetical index of people, places, things, and concepts related to or originating from the Byzantine Empire (AD 330–1453). Feel free to add more, and create missing pages. You can track changes to the articles included in this list from here.

Note: People are listed by first name. Events, monuments and institutions like "Battle/Siege/Council/Church/Duchy/etc. of NNN" are listed by the location/name.

A

 Aachen Cathedral
 Aaron (son of Ivan Vladislav)
 Aaronios
 Abas I of Armenia
 Abaskiron
 Abbasid Caliphate
 Abbasid invasion of Asia Minor (782)
 Abbasid invasion of Asia Minor (806)
 Al-Abbas ibn al-Ma'mun
 Al-Abbas ibn al-Walid
 Abd al-Aziz ibn al-Walid
 Abd al-Aziz ibn Shu'ayb
 Abdallah al-Battal
 Abdallah al-Khazin
 Abdallah ibn Abd al-Malik
 Abd Allah ibn al-Fadl
 Abdallah ibn Qais
 Abdallah ibn Rashid ibn Kawus
 Abd al-Malik ibn Marwan
 Abd al-Malik ibn Salih
 St. Aberkios Monastery
 Abkhazia, Kingdom of
 Ablabius (consul)
 Ablabius (assassin)
 About the Mystery of the Letters
 Abraham of Ephesus
 Abu Abdallah Umar ibn Shu'ayb
 Abu Firas al-Hamdani
 Abu Ghanim
 Abu Hafs ibn Amr
 Abu Hafs Umar al-Iqritishi
 Abu'l-Asa'ir Ahmad ibn Nasr
 Abu'l-Aswar Shavur ibn Fadl
 Abu'l-A'war
 Abulchares
 Abu'l-Faraj al-Tarsusi
 Abu'l-Fawaris Muhammad ibn Nasir al-Dawla
 Abu'l-Qasim (Seljuk governor of Nicaea)
 Abu'l-Qasim Ali ibn al-Hasan al-Kalbi
 Abu Thabit
 Abydikos
 Abydos (Hellespont)
 Abydos, Diocese of
 Acacius, Church of Saint
 Acacius, Patriarch of Constantinople
 Acacius of Amida
 Acacius (Alexandria)
 Acacius (curator)
 Acacius (proconsul)
 Acacius (son of Archelaus)
 Acarassus
 Achaea (Roman province)
 Achaea, Principality of
 Acheiropoietos, Church of the
 Acheiropoietos Monastery
 Achelous, 917 Battle of
 Achelous, 1359 Battle of
 Acilisene, Peace of
 Acindynus (Carrhae)
 Acritic songs
 Acropolitissa, wife of Michael of Trebizond
 Actuarius
 Adada, Pisidia
 Adalgis
 Adaloald
 Adamantius (praefectus urbi)
 Adarnase I of Iberia
 Adarnase II of Iberia
 Adarnase III of Iberia
 Adarnase IV of Iberia
 Adarnase V of Tao
 Ad Decimum, Battle of
 Adelchis of Benevento
 Adelphopoiesis
 Adeodatus I, Pope of Rome
 Adeodatus II, Pope of Rome
 Adergoudounbades
 Adolius
 Adralestos (Domestic of the Schools)
 Adramyttium
 Adrian I, Pope of Rome
 Adrian II, Pope of Rome
 Adrianople
 Adrianople, 378 Battle of
 Adrianople, 813 Siege of
 Adrianople, 1205 Battle of
 Adrianople, 1254 Battle of
 Adrianople, Conquest by the Turks
 Adrianople, Martyrs of
 Adrianos Komnenos
 Aedesia
 Aegean Sea
 Aegean Sea (theme)
 Aelia Eudocia
 Aelia Eudoxia
 Aelia Flaccilla
 Aetios (eunuch)
 Aetius, Cistern of
 Aetius (praetorian prefect)
 Aëtius of Amida
 Africa, Praetorian prefecture of
 African Romance
 Agallianos Kontoskeles
 Agapetus (deacon)
 Agapius (physician)
 Agatha (wife of Samuel of Bulgaria)
 Agathias
 Agatho, Pope of Rome
 Agathonicea
 Agilulf
 Agnellus, Bishop of Ravenna
 Agnes of France, Byzantine Empress
 Agnes of Montferrat
 Agnes of Durazzo
 Agoranomos
 Ahmad ibn al-Hasan al-Kalbi
 Ahmad ibn Kayghalagh
 Ahmad ibn Tughan al-Ujayfi
 Ahmad ibn Ziyadat Allah ibn Qurhub
 Aigan (Hun commander)
 AIMA prophecy
 Aistulf
 Aiulf II of Benevento
 Aizanoi
 Ajnadayn, Battle of
 Akakia
 Akameros
 Akolouthos
 Akova, Barony of
 Akritai
 Akroinon, Battle of
 Alahan Monastery
 Alamanikon
 Alan Cameron (classical scholar)
 Alans
 Albania in the Middle Ages
 Albania under the Byzantine Empire
 Albanian history, Timeline of
 Albia Dominica
 Alboin
 Albsuinda
 Alda of Alania
 Aldimir
 Aleppo
 Aleppo, 637 Siege of
 Aleppo, 962 Sack of
 Aleppo, 994–995 Siege of
 Alexander (comes)
 Alexander (discussor)
 Alexander (taxiarch)
 Alexander (supporter of Phocas)
 Alexander (Byzantine emperor)
 Alexander Kazhdan
 Alexander of Constantinople
 Alexander of Cyprus
 Alexander of Tralles
 Alexander of Trebizond
 Alexander van Millingen
 Alexander Vasiliev (historian)
 Alexandretta, Battle of
 Alexiad
 Alexios I Komnenos
 Alexios I of Trebizond
 Alexios Studites, Patriarch of Constantinople
 Alexios II Komnenos
 Alexios II of Trebizond
 Alexios III Angelos
 Alexios III of Trebizond
 Alexander III, Pope of Rome
 Alexios IV Angelos
 Alexios IV of Trebizond
 Alexios V Doukas
 Alexios V of Trebizond
 Alexios Angelos Philanthropenos
 Alexios Apokaukos
 Alexios Aristenos
 Alexios Aspietes
 Alexios Axouch
 Alexios Branas
 Alexios Charon
 Alexios Doukas Philanthropenos
 Alexios Gidos
 Alexios Kaballarios
 Alexios Komnenos (co-emperor)
 Alexios Komnenos (governor of Dyrrhachium)
 Alexios Komnenos (protosebastos)
 Alexios Komnenos (son of Andronikos I)
 Alexios Laskaris
 Alexios Laskaris Philanthropenos
 Alexios Mosele (admiral)
 Alexios Mosele (Caesar)
 Alexios Mosele (general)
 Alexios Palaiologos (despot)
 Alexios Philanthropenos
 Alexios Philes
 Alexios Raoul
 Alexios Strategopoulos
 Alexios Tzamplakon
 Alexios Xiphias
 Al-Halawiyah Madrasa
 Alexius of Rome
 Alexius Slav
 Ali ibn Yahya al-Armani
 Ali ibn Yusuf ibn Umar
 Alice-Mary Talbot
 Aligern
 Allagion
 Allelengyon
 Aloara
 Alp Arslan
 Altava
 Althias
 Alusian of Bulgaria
 Alviso Diedo
 Alypius of Constantinople
 Amadeus VI, Count of Savoy
 Amalafrid
 Amastrianum
 Amalasuintha
 Amalric I of Jerusalem
 Amantius (praepositus)
 Ambazuces
 Amicus of Giovinazzo
 Amioun, Battle of
 Ammar ibn Ali al-Kalbi
 Ammatus
 Ammianus Marcellinus
 Ammonius Hermiae
 Amorium
 Amorium, Sack of
 Amphilochius of Iconium
 Amr ibn Hind
 Amyclae, Diocese of
 Amytzantarioi
 Anagast
 Anatolia earthquake, 554
 Anagrapheus
 Anastasia (wife of Constantine IV)
 Anastasia the Patrician
 Anastasian War
 Anastasiopolis in Galatia
 Anastasiopolis in Thrace
 Anastasios Orlandos
 Anastasius, Patriarch of Constantinople
 Anastasius, Pope of Alexandria
 Anastasius I Dicorus
 Anastasius II
 Anastasius I of Antioch
 Anastasius II of Antioch
 Anastasius (consul 517)
 Anastasius (jurist)
 Anastasius Bibliothecarius
 Anastasius of Samaria
 Anastasius Sinaita
 Anatolia
 Anatolia, Byzantine
 Anatolic Theme
 Anatolius (consul)
 Anatolius, Patriarch of Constantinople
 Anatolius (curator)
 Anatolius (Osroene)
 Anchialus, 708 Battle of
 Anchialus, 763 Battle of
 Ancyra
 Ancyra, Metropolis of
 Andrassos, Battle of
 André Grabar
 Andrea Angeli
 Andrea Barozzi
 Andrea Ghisi
 Andrea Morisco
 Andreas of Samosata
 Andreas Palaiologos
 Andreas Palaiologos (son of Manuel)
 Andreas Stratos
 Andrew II of Naples
 Andrew, Duke of Calabria
 Andrew of Crete
 Andrew of Crete (martyr)
 Andrew the Scythian
 Andronicus, Coptic Pope of Alexandria
 Andronikos I Komnenos
 Andronikos I of Trebizond
 Andronikos II Palaiologos
 Andronikos II of Trebizond
 Andronikos III Palaiologos
 Andronikos III of Trebizond
 Andronikos IV Palaiologos
 Andronikos V Palaiologos
 Andronikos Angelos Palaiologos
 Andronikos Asen
 Andronikos Asen Zaccaria
 Andronikos Doukas (co-emperor)
 Andronikos Doukas (cousin of Michael VII)
 Andronikos Doukas (general under Leo VI)
 Andronikos Doukas Angelos
 Andronikos Doukas Palaiologos
 Andronikos Euphorbenos
 Andronikos Kamateros
 Andronikos Komnenos (son of Alexios I)
 Andronikos Komnenos (son of John II)
 Andronikos Kontostephanos
 Andronikos Kontostephanos (son of Isaac)
 Andronikos Lapardas
 Andronikos of Sardis
 Andronikos Palaiologos (died 1344)
 Andronikos Palaiologos (late 12th century)
 Andronikos Palaiologos (megas domestikos)
 Andronikos Palaiologos (son-in-law of Theodore I)
 Andronikos Palaiologos (son of Manuel II)
 Andronikos Palaiologos Kantakouzenos
 Anemas
 Anemas (died 971)
 Angeliki Laiou
 Angelo Flavio Comneno
 Angelo Maria Angeli
 Angelos
 An Entertaining Tale of Quadrupeds
 Anglon, Battle of
 Angilas
 Ani, Battle of
 Anicia Juliana
 Anicius Faustus Albinus Basilius
 Ankara
 Anna, wife of Artabasdos
 Anna Angelina Komnene Doukaina
 Anna Dalassene
 Anna Diogenissa
 Anna Komnene
 Anna Komnene Angelina
 Anna Komnene Doukaina
 Anna Notaras
 Anna of Hohenstaufen
 Anna of Hungary (1260–1281)
 Anna of Savoy
 Anna of Trebizond
 Anna of Trebizond, Queen of Georgia
 Anna of Moscow
 Anna Palaiologina (daughter of Andronikos Angelos Palaiologos)
 Anna Palaiologina (daughter of Michael IX)
 Anna Palaiologina Kantakouzene
 Anna Philanthropene
 Anna Porphyrogenita
 Anna Terter
 Anna Xylaloe
 Saint Anne Church, Trabzon
 Annianus of Alexandria
 Anno Domini
 Anseau de Cayeux
 Antalas
 Antalya, Siege of
 Anthemius
 Anthemius (praetorian prefect)
 Anthemius of Tralles
 Anthemius Isidorus
 Anthimus I, Patriarch of Constantinople
 Anthimus (physician)
 Anthimus of Naples
 Anthony Bryer
 Anthony Kaldellis
 Anthusa of Constantinople
 Anthusa of Mantinea
 Anthypatos
 Antilegomena
 Antioch
 Antioch earthquake, 526
 Antioch, 613 Battle of
 Antioch, Principality of
 Antiochos (strategos of Sicily)
 Antiochus (bishop of Ptolemais) 
 Antiochus (praepositus sacri cubiculi)
 Antiochus Chuzon
 Antipope Paschal
 Antipope Theodore
 Antonina (wife of Belisarius)
 Antony I Kassymatas, Patriarch of Constantinople
 Antony II Kauleas, Patriarch of Constantinople
 Antony III Studites, Patriarch of Constantinople
 Antony IV, Patriarch of Constantinople
 Antony of Larissa
 Antony the Younger
 Anushtakin al-Dizbari
 Anzen, Battle of
 Apahunik' earthquake, 461
 Apamea (Syria)
 Apamea, Battle of
 Aperlae
 Apion (family)
 Aplekton
 Apocrisiarius
 Apocrisiarius, Papal
 Apographeus
 Apokapes
 Apokaukos
 Apollinarius (governor)
 Apollinarius, Patriarch of Alexandria
 Apollonia, Cyrenaica
 Apollonia, Tower of
 Apollonius (praetorian prefect)
 Apollonius (consul 460)
 Apros
 Apros, Battle of
 Apsich
 Arabia (daughter of Justin II)
Arabia Petraea
 Arabs
 Arabs, Byzantine wars with the
 Arabs, 780–1180 Byzantine wars with the
 Araklovon Castle
 Aratius
 Arbanon, Principality of
 Arbanon, Rebellion of
 Arbazacius
 Arcadia (daughter of Arcadius)
 Arcadia, Barony of
 Arcadiopolis
 Arcadiopolis, 970 Battle of
 Arcadiopolis, 1194 Battle of
 Arcadiopolis, Diocese of
 Arcadius
 Arcadius, Baths of
 Arcadius, Column of
 Arcadius, Forum of
 Archangel ivory
 Architecture, Byzantine
 Architecture of Istanbul
 Ardabur (consul 427)
 Ardabur (consul 447)
 Ardagast
 Ardashir II
 Ardenica Monastery
 Arechis II of Benevento
 Areobindus Dagalaifus Areobindus
 Areobindus (died 546)
 Argyramoiboi
 Argyritzos
 Argyros (Byzantine family)
 Argyrus (catepan of Italy)
 Ariadne (empress)
 Arianism
 Arianites
 Arianitto Arianiti
 Aristaenetus
 Aristaenetus (consul)
 Aristomachus (Egypt)
 Arius
 Arkadios II, Archbishop of Cyprus
 Archontopouloi
 Argos and Nauplia, Lordship of
 Argos, Bishopric of
 Armatus
 Armenia
 Armenia, Byzantine
 Armenia earthquake. 632
 Armenia (Middle Ages), Kingdom of
 Armenia, Roman
 Armeniac Theme
 Armouris, Song of
 Army, Byzantine
 Army, Komnenian Byzantine
 Army, Palaiologan Byzantine
 Arneae
 Arietta Papaconstantinou
 Arsaber
 Arsaces (conspirator)
 Arsacius of Tarsus
 Arsakawan earthquake, 363
 Arsenios Autoreianos, Patriarch of Constantinople
 Arsenius, Patriarch of Alexandria
 Arsenius of Tyre
 Arsenius the Great
 Art, Byzantine
 Arta
 Arta, Castle of
 Artabanes
 Artabasdos
 Arthelais
 Artze
 Arzen
 Asad ibn al-Furat
 Asbadus
 Ascan
 Ascholius
 Asclepigenia
 Asclepiodotus (consul 423)
 Asclepiodotus (physician)
 Asclepiodotus of Alexandria
 Asclepius of Tralles
 Ascum
 Asekretis
 Asen and Peter, Uprising of
 Ashtat Yeztayar
 Ashot I of Armenia
 Ashot I of Iberia
 Ashot II of Armenia
 Ashot II of Tao
 Ashot III of Armenia
 Ashot III of Taron
 Ashot IV of Armenia
 Ashot Taronites
 Asia (Roman province)
 Asia, Diocese of
 Asia Minor
 Asia Minor Slavs
 Asomatianos Tzamplakon
 Aspad Gushnasp
 Aspar
 Aspar, Cistern of
 Asparukh of Bulgaria
 Aspietes
 Aspietes (general under Alexios I)
 Aspona
 Aspron
 Asterius of Amasea
 Asyut Treasure
 Atakam
 Atenulf I of Capua
 Athalaric
 Athanasios of Emesa
 Athanasius I, Patriarch of Constantinople
 Athanasius I Gammolo
 Athanasius II, Patriarch of Constantinople
 Athanasius (grandson of Theodora)
 Athanasius (praetorian prefect)
 Athanasius of Naples
 Athenogenes of Petra
 Athens
 Athens, Archbishopric of
 Athens, History of
 Athinganoi
 Atik Mustafa Pasha Mosque
 Atriklines
 Atticus, Archbishop of Constantinople
 Augusta (honorific)
 Augustaion
 Augustine of Canterbury
 Aurelianus (consul 400)
 Aurès, Kingdom of the
 Authari
 Autokrator
 Auxentius of Bithynia
 Auximus, Siege of
 Avanos
 Avars
 Avars, Byzantine wars with the
 Averil Cameron
 Avienus (consul 501)
 al-Awasim
 Ayasuluk Hill
 Aydinids
 Azaz, 1030 Battle of
 Al-Aziz
 Aziz al-Dawla

B

 Babylon Fortress
 Babylon Fortress, Siege of
 Badr al-Hammami
 Baduarius
 Baduarius (curator)
 Baduarius (Scythia)
 Bagradas River, 536 Battle of
 Bagrat I of Iberia
 Bagrat II Bagratuni
 Bagrat II of Iberia
 Bagrationi, wife of John IV of Trebizond
 Bahram Gushnasp
 Bahrām Chōbin
 Baioulos
 Baiounitai
 Bakjur
 Baktangios
 Balaban Aga Mosque
 Balatlar Church
 Baldwin I of Constantinople
 Baldwin I of Jerusalem
 Baldwin II of Constantinople
 Baldwin II of Jerusalem
 Baldwin III of Jerusalem
 Balearic Islands
 Balgitzin
 Balik (ruler)
 Bandon (Byzantine Empire)
 Bapheus, Battle of
 Bar, Battle of
 Barasbakourios
 Barbara Komnena
 Barberini ivory
 Barca (ancient city)
 Bardanes Tourkos
 Bardas
 Bardas Hikanatos
 Bardas Kontomytes
 Bardas Parsakoutenos
 Bardas Phokas the Elder
 Bardas Phokas the Younger
 Bardas Phokas the Younger, Rebellion of
 Bardas Skleros
 Baresmanas
 Bari
 Bari, Emirate of
 Bari, Louis II's 866–871 campaign against
 Bari, Siege of
 Barjawan
 Barlaam and Josaphat
 Barlaam of Seminara
 Basel, Council of
 Basil I
 Basil II
 Basil II, Epitaph on the tomb of
 Basil I Skamandrenos, Patriarch of Constantinople
 Basil II Kamateros, Patriarch of Constantinople
 Basil Apokapes
 Basil Apokaukos
 Basil Argyros
 Basil Boioannes
 Basil Doukas Kamateros
 Basil Hexamilites
 Basil Lekapenos
 Basil Mesardonites
 Basil of Ani
 Basil of Naples
 Basil of Trebizond
 Basil Onomagoulos
 Basil Peteinos
 Basil Skleros
 Basil the Confessor
 Basil the Copper Hand
 Basil the Physician
 Basil the Younger
 Basil Theodorokanos
 Basil Vatatzes
 Basilakes
 Basileopator
 Basileus
 Basilian monks
 Basilica Cistern
 Basilica di Santa Maria Maggiore
 Basilica of Sant'Apollinare Nuovo
 Basilica of San Vitale
 Basilides (patricius)
 Basilika
 Basilikoi anthropoi
 Basilikon
 Basilikos logos
 Basilinopolis
 Basiliscus
 Basiliscus (Caesar)
 Basiliskianos
 Basilissa
 Batheos Rhyakos Monastery
 Bathys Ryax, Battle of
 Battle tactics, Byzantine
 Bawi
 Bayezid I
 Beacon system, Byzantine
 Beatrice of Provence
 Beatrice of Sicily, Latin Empress
 Beirut earthquake, 551
 Béla III of Hungary
 Bela (Epirus)
 Belegezites
 Belgrade
 Belisarius
 Beloš
 Belthandros and Chrysantza
 Benedetto I Zaccaria
 Benedetto II Zaccaria
 Benedict I, Pope of Rome
 Benjamin I, Coptic Patriarch of Alexandria
 Bera
 Berat, 1280–1281 Siege of
 Berengaria of León
 Beresford Hope Cross
 Berichus
 Bernat de Rocafort
 Beroia, Battle of
 Bertha of Sulzbach
 Berthold II von Katzenelnbogen
 Berytus, Law School of
 Berziti
 Berzitia, Battle of
 Bessas
 Beth Alpha
 Bezant
 Bibliotheca (Photius)
 Biccari, Byzantine tower of
 Binbirkilise
 Bir el Qutt inscriptions
 Bisantius Guirdeliku
 Bishr al-Afshini
 Bishr ibn al-Walid
 Bithynia
 Bitola, 1015 Battle of
 Blachernae
 Blachernae, 1082 Council of
 Blachernae, 1094 Council of
 Blachernae, 1285 Council of
 Blachernae, 1351 Council of
 Blachernae, 1101 Crusader attack on
 Blachernae, Palace of
 Blaise of Amorion
 Blarathon, Battle of
 Bleschames
 Bodrum Mosque
 Boethius
 Bogdan Saray
 Bogomilism
 Bohemond I of Antioch
 Boleron
 Bonakis
 Boniface I, Pope of Rome
 Boniface I, Marquess of Montferrat
 Boniface II, Pope of Rome
 Boniface III, Pope of Rome
 Boniface IV, Pope of Rome
 Boniface V, Pope of Rome
 Boniface of Verona
 Bonus (patrician)
 Bonus (Sirmium)
 Book of Job in Byzantine illuminated manuscripts
 Boraides
 Boran
 Boril of Bulgaria
 Boris I of Bulgaria
 Boris Kalamanos
 Borradaile Triptych
 Bosphorus
 Bosra, Battle of
 Boukoleon Palace
 Boulgarophygon, Battle of
 Bourgaon, Battle of
 Bouzes
 Božidar Ferjančić
 Braničevo (1154), Siege of
 Branko Mladenović
 Bravlin
 Brindisi, 1156 Battle of
 Brontochion Monastery
 Bryas
 Bryennios
 Bucellarian Theme
 Bucellarius
 Buffavento Castle
 Bulgaria (theme)
 Bulgaria
 Bulgaria, Byzantine conquest of
 Bulgaria, Byzantine wars with
 Bulgaria, 716 treaty with
 Bulgaria, 815 treaty with
 Bulgaria, 894–896 war with
 Bulgaria, 913–927 war with
 Bulgaria, Christianization of
 Bulgaria, History of
 Bulgarian Empire, 1st
 Bulgarian Empire, 2nd
 Bulgars
 al-Buqaia, Battle of
 Burdunellus
 Bureaucracy and aristocracy
 Burqush
 Bursa, Siege of
 Bushra al-Thamali
 Byzacena
 Byzantine civilisation in the 12th century
 Byzantine commonwealth
 Byzantine emperors, Family tree of the
 Byzantine Empire
 Byzantine Empire, History of the
 Byzantine Empire, Succession to the
 Byzantine Empire under the Amorian dynasty
 Byzantine Empire under the Angelos dynasty
 Byzantine Empire under the Doukas dynasty
 Byzantine Empire under the Heraclian dynasty
 Byzantine Empire under the Isaurian dynasty
 Byzantine Empire under the Komnenos dynasty
 Byzantine Empire under the Leonid dynasty
 Byzantine Empire under the Macedonian dynasty
 Byzantine Empire under the Nikephorian dynasty
 Byzantine Empire under the Palaiologos dynasty
 Byzantine Empire under the Theodosian dynasty
 Byzantine Fresco Chapel
 Byzantine Papacy
 Byzantine–Sasanian War of 602–628
 Byzantine–Sasanian wars
 Byzantinische Zeitschrift
 Byzantinism
 Byzantium
 Byzantium: The Early Centuries
 Byzantium (color)
 Byzantium (play)
 Byzantium after Byzantium
 Byzantius (archbishop of Bari)

C

 Caenophrurium
 Caesar (title)
 Caesarea
 Caesarea Maritima
 Caesarea Mazaca
 Caesarius (consul)
 Caesaropapism
 Caesaropolis
 Calabria
 Calendar, Byzantine
 Callinicum
 Callinicum, Battle of
 Callinicus (exarch)
 Callinicus I, Patriarch of Constantinople
 Callistus I, Patriarch of Constantinople
 Callistus II Xanthopoulos, Patriarch of Constantinople
 Calocaerus
 Caloe
 Calonymus
 Caltavuturo, Battle of
 Camuliana
 Canbazlı
 Çanlı Kilise
 Cannae, 1018 Battle of
 Capetian House of Anjou
 Capidava
 Cappadocia
 Cappadocia (Roman province)
 Cappadocia (theme)
 Cappadocia, Rock-cut architecture of
 Caria
 Carlo I Tocco
 Carlo II Tocco
 Carmagnola (Venice)
 Carolingian dynasty
 Carolingian Empire
 Carthage
 Carthage, Archdiocese of
 Carthage, 698 Battle of
 Časlav
 Caspian Gates earthquake, 743
 Cassiodorus
 Castle of Sant'Aniceto
 Catacomb of Phaneromeni Church
 Catalan Campaign in Asia Minor
 Catalan Company
 Cataphract
 Catepanate of Italy
 Caterina Gattilusio
 Catharism
 Saint Catherine's Monastery
 Saint Catherine, Thessaloniki, Church of
 Catherine of Bulgaria
 Catherine of Courtenay
 Catherine of Valois (1303–1346)
 Catherine Zaccaria
 Cattolica di Stilo
 Caucasian Albania
 Cécile Morrisson
 Celer (magister officiorum)
 Centre for Byzantine Research
 Centurione II Zaccaria
 Cephallenia (theme)
 Cephalonia
 Cephalonia, Battle of
 Cestrus
 Chalandritsa, Barony of
 Chalazar
 Chalcedon
 Chalcedon, Council of
 Chalcedon, Metropolis of
 Chalcis
 Chalcis in Syria
 Chalcis in Thrace
 Chaldia
 Chalke
 Chalkoprateia
 Chanaranges (Italy)
 Chandax, Siege of
 Chandrenos
 Chariopolis
 Chariopolis, Bishopric of
 Chariot racing
 Charito
 Chariton, Patriarch of Constantinople
 Charlemagne
 Charles I of Naples
 Charles II of Naples
 Charles III of Naples
 Charles, Count of Valois
 Charles Annibal Fabrot
 Charles Diehl
 Charles du Fresne, sieur du Cange
 Charpezikion
 Charsianon
 Chartophylax
 Chartoularios
 Chase (son of Ioube)
 Chatalar Inscription
 Chatzon
 Chelandion
 Chelchal
 Chernomen, Treaty of
 Cherson
 Cherson (theme)
 Chilbudius
 Childebert II
 Chiliades
 Chiliarch
 Chinialon
 Choma (fortress)
 Choma (Lycia)
 Chonae
 Chora Monastery
 Choricius of Gaza
 Christ (title)
 Christ Chalkites, Church of
 Christ Pantokrator (Nesebar), Church of
 Christ Pantocrator (Sinai)
 Christianization of the Roman Empire
Christianization of the Roman Empire as diffusion of innovation
 Christianity, History of
 Christodorus
 Christopher (Domestic of the Schools)
 Christopher Lekapenos
 Christophoros Burgaris
 Christoupolis
 Chronicle of 741
 Chronicle of 813
 Chronicle of 846
 Chronicle of 1234
 Chronicon Paschale
 Chrysaphius
 Chrysargyron
 Chrysobull
 Chrysocheir
 Chrysopolis
 Chrysotriklinos
 Church Fathers
 Church History (Eusebius)
 Church of All Nations
 Cibyrrhaeot Theme
 Civil war of 1321–1328
 Civil war of 1341–1347
 Civil war of 1352–1357
 Civil war of 1373–1379
 Cilicia
 Cilicia (Roman province)
 Cilicia, Byzantine conquest of
 Ciriaco de' Pizzicolli
 Citadel of Salah Ed-Din
 Cities in the Byzantine Empire
 Clarissimus
 Claudiopolis
 Claudiopolis, See of
 Claudiopolis, Siege of
 Clearchus (consul)
 Cleofa Malatesta
 Clibanarii
 Clovis I
 Clermont, Council of
 Coccas (soldier)
 Codex Hierosolymitanus
 Codex Theodosianus
 Codex Justinianeus
 Colossae
 Colossus of Barletta
 Column of Justinian
 Column of Phocas
 Comacchio, Battle of
 Comentiolus
 Comentiolus (brother of Phocas)
 Comes rerum privatarum
 Comes sacrarum largitionum
 Comito
 Comnenus
 Conditum
 Conon, Count of Montaigu
 Conon, Pope of Rome
 Conrad III
 Conrad of Montferrat
 Consistorium
 Constans
 Constans II
 Constans (consul 414)
 Constantina
 Constantina (empress)
 Constantina (Osrhoene)
 Constantine I the Great
 Constantine the Great and Christianity
 Constantine I, Patriarch of Constantinople
 Constantine I, Prince of Armenia
 Constantine II
 Constantine II, Patriarch of Constantinople
 Constantine II, Prince of Armenia
 Constantine III
 Constantine III Leichoudes, Patriarch of Constantinople
 Constantine IV
 Constantine IV, Patriarch of Constantinople
 Constantine V
 Constantine VI
 Constantine VII
 Constantine VIII
 Constantine IX Monomachos
 Constantine X Doukas
 Constantine XI Palaiologos
 Constantine, Pope of Rome
 Constantine (son of Leo V)
 Constantine, son of Theophilos
 Constantine Angelos
 Constantine Angelos Doukas
 Constantine Arianites
 Constantine Arianiti
 Constantine Aspietes
 Constantine Bodin
 Constantine Chabaron
 Constantine Chadenos
 Constantine Chliarenos
 Constantine Choirosphaktes
 Constantine Dalassenos (duke of Antioch)
 Constantine Dalassenos (thalassokrator)
 Constantine Diogenes
 Constantine Diogenes (son of Romanos IV)
 Constantine Diogenes (pretender)
 Constantine Doranites
 Constantine Doukas (co-emperor)
 Constantine Doukas (died 1179)
 Constantine Doukas (usurper)
 Constantine Doukas of Thessaly
 Constantine Dragaš
 Constantine Euphorbenos Katakalon
 Constantine Gabras
 Constantine Gongyles
 Constantine Harmenopoulos
 Constantine Helladikos
 Constantine the Jew
 Constantine Kabasilas
 Constantine Kalamanos
 Constantine Keroularios
 Constantine Komnenos Angelos
 Constantine Komnenos Arianites
 Constantine Komnenos Doukas
 Constantine Kontomytes
 Constantine Lardys
 Constantine Laskaris
 Constantine Lekapenos
 Constantine Lips
 Constantine Loukites
 Constantine Makrodoukas
 Constantine Maniakes
 Constantine Margarites
 Constantine Meliteniotes
 Constantine Mesopotamites
 Constantine of Nicaea
 Constantine Opos (catepan)
 Constantine Opos (megas doux)
 Constantine Palaiologos (half-brother of Michael VIII)
 Constantine Palaiologos (son of Andronikos II)
 Constantine Palaiologos (son of Michael VIII)
 Constantine Paparrigopoulos
 Constantine Phokas
 Constantine Podopagouros
 Constantine Stilbes
 Constantine Tessarakontapechys
 Constantine Tikh of Bulgaria
 Constantine Tornikes
 Constantine, Forum of
 Constantinian dynasty
 Constantinople
 Constantinople, 378 Battle of
 Constantinople, 447 earthquake
 Constantinople, 922 Battle of
 Constantinople, 1147 Battle of
 Constantinople, 1241 Battle of
 Constantinople, First Council
 Constantinople, Second Council
 Constantinople, Third Council
 Constantinople, Fourth Council (Roman Catholic)
 Constantinople, Fourth Council (Eastern Orthodox)
 Constantinople, Fifth Council
 Constantinople, 536 Council of
 Constantinople, 843 Council of
 Constantinople, 867 Council of
 Constantinople earthquake, 557
 Constantinople earthquake, 740
 Constantinople, Fall of
 Constantinople, Latin Patriarch of
 Constantinople, Reconquest of
 Constantinople, 14 regions of
 Constantinople, 626 Siege of
 Constantinople, 674–678 Siege of
 Constantinople, 717–718 Siege of
 Constantinople, 1203 Siege of
 Constantinople, 1204 Siege of
 Constantinople, 1235 Siege of
 Constantinople, 1260 Siege of
 Constantinople, 1394–1402 Siege of
 Constantinople, 1411 Siege of
 Constantinople, 1422 Siege of
 Constantinople, Tyche of
 Constantinus (consul 457)
 Constantius II
 Constantius Gallus
 Constantiolus
 Consul
 Coptic period
 Consularis
 Corinth
 Corinth, 1458 Siege of
 Corfu
 Corfu, Metropolis of
 Corinth
 Corinth, Latin Archbishopric of
 Corinth, Metropolis of
 Coronation of the Byzantine emperor
 Corpus Fontium Historiae Byzantinae
 Corpus Scriptorum Historiae Byzantinae
 Corpus Juris Civilis
 Corrector
 Corydala
 Cosmas Indicopleustes
 Cosmas I, Patriarch of Alexandria
 Cosmas I, Patriarch of Constantinople
 Cosmas II Atticus, Patriarch of Constantinople
 Cosmas of Maiuma
 Cosmas Vestitor
 Cotyaeum
 Cotyaeum, Battle of
 Count of the Stable
 Count of the Tent
 Cours (Byzantine general)
 Courtenay, House of
 Coutzes
 Covered Hippodrome
 Crete
 Crete, Byzantine
 Crete earthquake, 365
 Crete, Emirate of
 Crimea
 Crimean Goths
 Crispus
 Croatia, Duchy of
 Croatia, 925–1102 Kingdom of
 Croats
 Cross-in-square
 Cross of Justin II
 Crusader invasions of Egypt
 Crusader states
 Crusades
 Cubicularius
 Cuisine, Byzantine
 Cumans
 Currency, Byzantine
 Cutzinas
 Cyprus
 Cyprus (theme)
 Cyprus, History of
 Cyprus, Kingdom of
 Cyprus in the Middle Ages
 Cyriacus the Anchorite
 Cyriacus II, Patriarch of Constantinople
 Saints Cyril and Methodius
 Cyril Mango
 Cyril, Patriarch of Alexandria
 Cyril of Scythopolis
 Cyrrhus
 Cyrus, Patriarch of Constantinople
 Cyrus, Patriarch of Alexandria
 Cyrus of Panopolis
 Cyzicus, Battle of the

D

 Dalle Carceri
 Dacia, Diocese of
 Dagalaifus (consul 461)
 Dagisthaeus
 Dagmar Cross
 Daimonoioannes
 Dajti Castle
 Dalassenos
 Dalisandus (Isauria)
 Dalisandus (Pamphylia)
 Dalmatia
 Dalmatia (theme)
 Dalmatius
 Damascius
 Damascus
 Damascus, 634 Siege of
 Damian, Coptic Patriarch of Alexandria
 Damian (parakoimomenos)
 Damian of Tarsus
 Damian Dalassenos
 Damietta
 Damietta, 853 Sack of
 Damnazes
 Damsel of Cyprus
 Dance, Byzantine
 Daniel, Greek Apocalypse
 Danielis
 Danishmends
 Danube
 Daphne, Palace of
 Daphni Monastery
 Dara (Mesopotamia)
 Dara, Battle of
 Dara, 573 Siege of
 Dara Dam
 Dardanus (city)
 Darius (praetorian prefect)
 Dark Ages (historiography)
 Dark Ages, Byzantine
 Dathin, Battle of
 Dattus
 Daughter of Julius Constantius
 David (commentator)
 David (son of Heraclius)
 David I of Iberia
 David II of Iberia
 David III of Tao
 David Arianites
 David Plates
 David Saharuni
 David of Ohrid
 David of Trebizond
 Dead Brother's Song, The
 De Administrando Imperio
 Debeltos
 Debeltos, Siege of
 De Ceremoniis
 Decanus
 Decarch (military rank)
 Decius (consul 529)
 Decius (exarch)
 Decius Paulinus
 Decline of the Byzantine Empire
 Degik
 Dejan Dragaš
 Dekanos
 Delhemma
 Demarchos
 Demetrias
 Demetrios I Kantakouzenos
 Demetrios Angelos Doukas
 Demetrios Chloros
 Demetrios Doukas Kabasilas
 Demetrios Doukas Komnenos Koutroules
 Demetrios Iatropoulos
 Demetrios Komnenos Eudaimonoioannes
 Demetrios Kydones
 Demetrios Laskaris Leontares
 Demetrios Palaiologos
 Demetrios Palaiologos (son of Andronikos II)
 Demetrios Palaiologos Kantakouzenos
 Demetrios Palaiologos Metochites
 Demetrios Tzamplakon
 Demetritzes, Battle of
 Demetrius of Anacopia
 Demetrius of Bulgaria
 Demetrius Rhodocanakis
 Demetrius Triclinius
 Demophilus of Constantinople
 Demotika
 Demotika, Battle of
 Deno Geanakoplos
 De obsidione toleranda
 Desa (monarch)
 De Situ Terrae Sanctae
 Despina Khatun
 Despotes
 Devastatio Constantinopolitana
 Develtos
 De velitatione bellica
 Devol (Albania)
 Devol, Treaty of
 Dhu'l-Kala Samayfa
 Dhuvjan Monastery
 Diaconicon
 Dibaltum, Battle of
 Digenes Akritas
 Digest (Roman law)
 Dikaiodotes
 Dikaiophylax
 Dimitri Obolensky
 Dimitris Krallis
 Dimbos, Battle of
 Diocese
 Diocletian
 Diogenes of Phoenicia
 Dioiketes
 Diokleia
 Dionysiopolis
 Dionysios Zakythinos
 Dionysiou monastery
 Dioscorus II, Coptic Patriarch of Alexandria
 Dioscorus of Aphrodito
 Diplomacy, Byzantine
 Diptych
 Dobromir Chrysos
 Dobroslav II
 Dobrodeia of Kiev
 Dobrotitsa
 Dobruja
 Dobruja, Despotate of
 Docheiariou monastery
 Doctrina Jacobi
 Domenico Gattilusio
 Domenico Leoni
 Domentzia
 Domentziolus (brother of Phocas)
 Domentziolus (nephew of Phocas)
 Domestic of the Schools
 Domestikos
 Dometiopolis
 Domitian of Melitene
 Domitius Modestus
 Domnentiolus
 Domnicus
 Donald Nicol
 Donation of Constantine
 Donatism
 Donatus (Huns)
 Donus, Pope of Rome
 Dorino I Gattilusio
 Dorino II Gattilusio
 Dorostolon
 Dorostolon, Siege of
 Dorotheus (magister militum)
 Dorotheus I of Athens
 Dorylaeum
 Dositheus, Patriarch of Constantinople
 Doukas
 Doukas (historian)
 Doukatopoulon
 Doula Mouriki
 Doxapatres Boutsaras
 Dress, Byzantine
 Droctulf
 Dromon
 Drougoubitai
 Droungarios
 Droungarios of the Fleet
 Droungarios of the Watch
 Dryinopolis
 Drypia
 Duchy of Athens
 Duchy of the Archipelago
 Dumbarton Oaks Papers
 Dux
 Dvin earthquake, 863
 Dynatoi
 Dyrrhachium
 Dyrrhachium (theme)
 Dyrrhachium, 1081 Battle of
 Dyrrhachium, 1107–1108 Siege of
 Đorđe Bodinović

E

 Early Byzantine mosaics in the Middle East
 East, Diocese of the
 East–West Schism
 Eastern Orthodox Church
 Eastern Orthodox liturgical calendar
 Echinades, 1427 Battle of the
 Echinos
 Economy, Byzantine
 Ecthesis
 Edeco
 Edessa
 Edessa, County of
 Edessa, 544 Siege of
 Edward Gibbon
 Egypt (Roman province)
 Egypt (Late Antiquity), Diocese of
 Egypt in the Middle Ages
 Egypt, Muslim conquest of
 Ek prosopou
 Elemag
 Elena Asenina of Bulgaria
 Eleusa icon
 Eleutherios, Harbour of
 Eleutherios the Younger
 Eleutherius (exarch)
 Elias (commentator)
 Elias of Enna
 Elizabeth Jeffreys
 Elizabeth of Slavonia
 Elmingir
 Elpidius (rebel)
 Emesa
 Emesa, 635/6 Siege of
 Emesa, 638 Siege of
 Enamel, Byzantine
 Enaton
 Endemic synod
 Enrico Dandolo
 Enrico de Vigo Paleologo
 Eparchy
 Ephesus
 Ephesus, First Council
 Ephesus, Second Council
 Ephesus, Metropolis of
 Epi tes katastaseos
 Epi tes trapezes
 Epi ton deeseon
 Epi ton kriseon
 Epi tou eidikou
 Epi tou stratou
 Epibatai
 Epiphanius, Patriarch of Constantinople
 Epirus
 Epirus, Despotate of
 Epirus, Despot of
 Episkepsis
 Erard I of Aulnay
 Eraric
 Ernest Mamboury
 Ernst Kitzinger
 Ernst Stein
 Erotapokriseis
 Erzurum earthquake, 840
 Esau de' Buondelmonti
 Escorial Taktikon
 Ese Kapi Mosque
 Eski Imaret Mosque
 Eslas
 Esphigmenou Monastery
 Essence–Energies distinction
 Eternal Peace (532)
 Etymologicum Magnum
 Eudocia
 Eudokia (wife of Justinian II)
 Eudokia, wife of Constantine V
 Eudokia Angelina
 Eudokia Baïana
 Eudokia Dekapolitissa
 Eudokia Ingerina
 Eudokia Komnene (daughter of Alexios I)
 Eudokia Komnene, wife of William VIII of Montpellier
 Eudokia Makrembolitissa
 Eudokia of Trebizond
 Eudokia Palaiologina
 Eudoxia
 Eudoxia Epiphania
 Eudoxius of Antioch
 Eugene I, Pope of Rome
 Eugenius Vulgarius
 Eukarpia
 Eukterion
 Eulalios
 Eulamius
 Eulogios the Persian
 Eulogius, Patriarch of Alexandria
 Eumathios Philokales
 Euphemia (empress)
 Euphemianos, Lysi, Church of Saint
 Euphemius, Patriarch of Constantinople
 Euphemius (Sicily)
 Euphratensis
 Euphrosyne (9th century)
 Euphrosyne Doukaina Kamatera
 Euphrosyne of Bulgaria
 Euripos, Siege of
 Euroea (Epirus)
 Eusebia (empress)
 Eusebius
 Eusebius of Nicomedia
 Eusebius of Thessalonica
 Eustace of Flanders
 Eustathios (governor of the Cibyrrhaeot Theme)
 Eustathios Argyros (admiral under Leo VI)
 Eustathios Argyros (general under Leo VI)
 Eustathios Kymineianos
 Eustathios Makrembolites
 Eustathios Palatinos
 Eustathios Rhomaios
 Eustathius (consul)
 Eustathius, Patriarch of Constantinople
 Eustathius of Epiphania
 Eustathius of Thessalonica
 Eustratios of Constantinople
 Eustratius Garidas, Patriarch of Constantinople
 Eustratius of Nicaea
 Eutharic
 Euthymios Malakes
 Euthymios Tornikios
 Euthymius I Syncellus, Patriarch of Constantinople
 Euthymius II, Patriarch of Constantinople
 Euthymius of Athos
 Euthymius of Constantinople (11th century)
 Euthymius of Sardis
 Eutolmius Tatianus
 Eutropia
 Eutropius (consul 399)
 Eutropius, Harbor of
 Eutyches
 Eutychianus (consul 398)
 Eutychius, Patriarch of Constantinople
 Eutychius (exarch)
 Ewer of Saint-Maurice d'Agaune
 Evagrius of Antioch
 Evagrius of Constantinople
 Evagrius Scholasticus
 Évelyne Patlagean
 Exarch
 Exaugustus Boioannes
 Excubitors
 Exisotes
 Exokatakoiloi
 Exousiastes
 Ezeritai
 Ezeros

F

 Fabia Eudokia
 Fadala ibn Ubayd
 Fahl, Battle of
 Fall of Constantinople
 Fanari, Karditsa
 Fariburz
 Faroald II of Spoleto
 Farrukh Hormizd
 Faruriyyah, Capture of
 Fatih Mosque, Tirilye
 Fatih Mosque, Trabzon
 Fatimid Caliphate
 Fausta
 Fausta (wife of Constans II)
 Faustina (wife of Constantius II)
 Faventia, Battle of
 Felice Cornicola
 Felix of Ravenna
 Fenari Isa Mosque
 Feraklos Castle
 Ferdinand Chalandon
 Ferdinand Palaiologos
 Ferran d'Aunés
 Fetih 1453
 Ferrara-Florence, Council of
 Fibula (brooch)
 Fieschi Morgan Staurotheke
 Fifth Ecumenical Council
 Fifty-Year Peace Treaty
 Filioque
 Firaz, Battle of
 First Crusade
 First Ecumenical Council
 First Cyprus Treasure
 Flags and insignia, Byzantine
 Flavia Maximiana Theodora
 Flavia Julia Constantia
 Flavian, Archbishop of Constantinople
 Flavius Anastasius Paulus Probus Moschianus Probus Magnus
 Flavius Cresconius Corippus
 Flavius Hermogenes
 Flavius Studius
 Florence, Council of
 Florent of Hainaut
 Florentius (consul 429)
 Florentius of Sardis
 Foederati
 Follis
 Foreign relations of the Byzantine Empire
 Forty-Nine Martyrs of Scetis
 Forty-Two Martyrs of Amorium
 Fourth Crusade
 Fourth Ecumenical Council
 Francesco I Gattilusio
 Francesco II Gattilusio
 Francis Dvornik
 Frankish Table of Nations
 Franks
 Frankokratia
 Franz Dölger
 Fravitta, Patriarch of Constantinople
 Frederick I, Holy Roman Emperor
 Frederick II, Holy Roman Emperor
 Frigidus, Battle of the
 Fulk, King of Jerusalem
 Fyodor Uspensky

G

 Gabras
 Gabriel of Melitene
 Gabriel Sphrantzes
 Gabriele Trevisano
 Gaeta, Duchy of
 Gagik I of Vaspurakan
 Gagik II of Armenia
 Gainas
 Gaianites
 Galata
 Galatia (Roman province)
 Galaxidi
 Galeria Valeria
 Galesios, Mount
 Galla (wife of Theodosius I)
 Galla Placidia
 Gallipoli, 1312 Battle of
 Gallipoli, 1416 Battle of
 Gallipoli, Fall of
 Gallipoli, Reconquest of
 Gallipoli, Treaty of
 Gardens, Byzantine
 Gardiki, Battle of
 Gardiki Castle, Arcadia
 Gardiki, Phthiotis
 Gardiki, Trikala
 Gardiki Castle, Corfu
 Garella
 Garigliano, Battle of
 Gavinus
 Gaza synagogue
 Gelimer
 Gemistus Pletho
 Gennadius I, Patriarch of Constantinople
 Gennadius II Scholarius, Patriarch of Constantinople
 Gennadius (magister militum Africae)
 Gennadius (7th century)
 Genoa
 Genoa, Republic of
 Genoa, Byzantine war with (1348–1349)
 Gento (Goth)
 Genseric
 Geoffrey I of Villehardouin
 Geoffrey II of Briel
 Geoffrey II of Villehardouin
 Geoffroy de Thoisy
 Geoffrey of Aulnay
 Geoffrey of Briel
 Geoffrey of Villehardouin
 St. George (Kurbinovo), Church of
 St. George Diasoritis, Church of
 St. George (Skyros), Monastery of
 George, Emperor of Trebizond
 George I, Patriarch of Constantinople
 George I of Bulgaria
 George II Xiphilinus, Patriarch of Constantinople
 George II of Abkhazia
 George II of Bulgaria
 George (eparch)
 George Akropolites
 George Bardanes
 George Choiroboskos
 George Choumnos
 George Doukas Philanthropenos
 George Galesiotes
 George Kedrenos
 George Kleidas
 George Maniakes
 George Moschabar
 George Mouzalon
 George of Amastris
 George of Cyprus
 George of Kiev
 George of Naples
 George of Pisidia
 George of Trebizond
 George Ostrogorsky
 George Pachymeres
 George Palaiologos
 George Palaiologos Kantakouzenos
 George Phakrases
 George Synadenos Astras
 George Syncellus
 George Tagaris
 George the Confessor
 George the Standard-Bearer
 Georgi Voyteh
 Georgi Voyteh, Uprising of
 Georgia (country)
 Georgia (country), History of
 Georgia, 1022 Byzantine treaty with
 Georgia, 1031 Byzantine treaty with
 Georgia, Byzantine wars with
 Georgios Kalliergis
 Georgius Tzul
 Geraki, Barony of
 Gerasimus I, Patriarch of Constantinople
 Germanicia
 Germanicia, Siege of
 Germanicopolis (Bithynia)
 Germanicopolis, Isauria
 Germanus I, Patriarch of Constantinople
 Germanus II, Patriarch of Constantinople
 Germanus III, Patriarch of Constantinople
 Germanus (Caesar)
 Germanus (cousin of Justinian I)
 Germanus (magister militum under Phocas)
 Germanus (patricius)
 Germia
 Gessius (praetorian prefect)
Ghassanids
 Al-Ghazal
 Ghisi
 Geremia Ghisi
 Gibal
 Giorgio de' Buondelmonti
 Giovanni I Participazio
 Giovanni Andrea I Angeli
 Giovanni Andrea II Angeli
 Giovanni Colonna (died 1245)
 Giovanni Demetrio Angeli
 Giovanni Galbaio
 Giovanni Giustiniani
 Girolamo I Angeli
 Girolamo II Angeli
 Gisulf I of Benevento
 Gisulf I of Salerno
 Gisulf II of Benevento
 Giudicati
 Giustiniano Participazio
 Gjin Bua Spata
 Gjon Zenebishi
 Glarentza
 Glass, Byzantine
 Glavinica (medieval town)
 Glycerius
 Glyki
 Godas
 Godescalc of Benevento
 Godfrey of Bouillon
 Godfrey of Esch
 Godilas
 Golden Horn
 Gordas
 Gordoservon
 Göreme, Churches of
 Gothia, Metropolitanate of
 Gothic War (535–554)
 Gothograecia
 Gradinja
 Gradislav Borilović
 Graitzas Palaiologos
 Grand Domestic
 Grasulf I of Friuli
 Gratian
 Great Lavra (Athos)
 Great Moravia
 Great Palace of Constantinople
 Great Palace Mosaic Museum
 Great Vlachia
 Greece
 Greece, Byzantine
 Greek, Roman, and Byzantine Studies
 Greek fire
 Greek language
 Greek Madonna (sculpture)
 Greeks, Byzantine
 Gregentios
 Gregoras Iberitzes
 Gregoria
 Gregory, Patriarch of Antioch
 Gregory I the Great, Pope of Rome
 Gregory I of Nazianzus, Archbishop of Constantinople
 Gregory I of Naples
 Gregory II, Pope of Rome
 Gregory II of Cyprus, Patriarch of Constantinople
 Gregory II of Naples
 Gregory III, Pope of Rome
 Gregory III Mammas, Patriarch of Constantinople
 Gregory III of Naples
 Gregory IV of Naples
 Gregory VII, Pope of Rome
 Gregory Akindynos
 Gregory Antiochos
 Gregory Asbestas
 Gregory Chioniades
 Gregory Gabras
 Gregory Kamateros
 Gregory Kamonas
 Gregory of Benevento
 Gregory of Dekapolis
 Gregory Pakourianos
 Gregory Pakourianos the Younger
 Gregory Palamas
 Gregory Pterotos
 Gregory Tarchaneiotes
 Gregory Taronites
 Gregory Taronites (governor of Chaldia)
 Gregory the Patrician
 Saint Gregory of Nyssa Church, Trabzon
 Grigor I of Taron
 Grimoald, King of the Lombards
 Grimoald III of Benevento
 Gritzena, Barony of
 Grubeša
 Guaimar I of Salerno
 Guaimar II of Salerno
 Guaimar III of Salerno
 Guaimar IV of Salerno
 Guaram I of Iberia
 Guaram II of Iberia
 Guaram III of Iberia
 Gubazes I of Lazica
 Gubazes II of Lazica
 Guglielmo Cavallo
 Gulf of Corinth, Battle of the
 Gulfaris
 Gulkhan-Eudokia of Georgia
 Gül Mosque
 Guntarith
 Gunthamund
 Gunthertuch
 Gurgen I of Tao
 Gustave Schlumberger
 Guy II de la Roche
 Guy IV of Spoleto
 Guy of Hauteville
 Guy Pallavicini

H

 Habib ibn Maslama al-Fihri
 Al-Hadi
 Haemimontus
 Hagia Irene
 Hagia Sophia
 Hagia Sophia, Drama
 Hagia Sophia, Iznik
 Hagia Sophia, Thessaloniki
 Hagia Sophia Church, Sofia
 Hagia Sophia, Trabzon
 Hagios Demetrios
 Al-Hakim bi-Amr Allah
 Hamdanid dynasty
 Hançerkale
 Hannibalianus
 Hans Georg Beck
 Harald Hardrada
 Haram, Battle of
 Harbaville Triptych
 Harim, Battle of
 al-Harith ibn al-Hakam
 al-Harith ibn Jabalah
 Harun al-Rashid
 Al-Hasan ibn al-Abbas
 Al-Hasan ibn Ali al-Kalbi
 Al-Hasan ibn Ali Kurah
 Al-Hasan ibn Ammar
 Al-Hasan ibn Qahtaba
 Hebdomon
 Hebdomon, Cistern of the
 Hegias
 Helena, daughter of Alypius
 Helena
 Helena (wife of Julian)
 Helena (niece of Justin II)
 Helena Angelina Doukaina
 Helena Angelina Komnene
 Helena Argyre
 Helena Asanina Kantakouzene
 Helena Doukaina Angelina
 Helena Dragaš
 Helena Kantakouzene
 Helena Kantakouzene, Empress of Trebizond
 Helena Lekapene
 Helena Palaiologina (daughter of Demetrios Palaiologos)
 Helene Ahrweiler
 Heliodorus (philosopher)
 Helion (magister officiorum)
 Heliopolis, Battle of
 Heliou Bomon monastery
 Hellas (theme)
 Hellenic Institute of Byzantine and Post-Byzantine Studies in Venice
 Hellenization in the Byzantine Empire
 Henotikon
 Henri Grégoire (historian)
 Henry of Flanders
 Heraclea in Trachis
 Heraclian revolt
 Heraclides (bishop)
 Heraclius
 Heraclius' campaign of 622
 Heraclius (brother of Tiberius III)
 Heraclius (son of Constans II)
 Heraclius of Edessa
 Heraclius the Elder
 Heraklonas
 Herbert Hunger
 Heresy
 Hermit
 Hermogenes (magister officiorum)
 Hermoniakos' Iliad
 Hero the Younger
 Herodian (commander)
 Hervé Frankopoulos
 Hestia Tapestry
 Hesychasm
 Hesychast controversy
 Hesychius of Miletus
 Hetaireia
 Hetaireiarches
 Hexagram (currency)
 Hexamilion wall
 Hexapolis of Armenia Minor
 Hierapolis
 Hierapolis, Metropolitan See of
 Hieria
 Hieria, Council of
 Hierius (consul)
 Hierocles (author of Synecdemus)
 Hikanatoi
 Hilandar
 Hilarion
 Hilarion the Younger
 Hilarion, Castle of Saint
 Hildeprand
 Hilderic
 Himerios (admiral)
 Hippiatrica
 Hippodrome of Constantinople
 Hirami Ahmet Pasha Mosque
 Hisarlaka fortress
 Hisham ibn Abd al-Malik
 Histamenon
 Historia Augusta
 History of Anatolia
History of Istanbul
 History of Roman and Byzantine domes
 Holy Apostles, Church of the (Constantinople)
 Holy Apostles, Church of the (Thessaloniki)
 Holy Crown of Hungary
 Holy Roman Empire
 Holy Sepulchre, Church of
 Holy Trinity, Church of the (Athens)
 Honorius (emperor)
 Honorius I, Pope of Rome
 Hormidac
 Hormizd (Constantinople)
 Hormizd II
 Hormizd III
 Hormizd IV
 Horreum Margi, Battle of
 Hosios Loukas
 Hospito
 Hovhannes-Smbat III of Armenia
 Hrach Bartikyan
 Hranislav
 Hugh I, Count of Vermandois
 Hugh IV, Count of Saint-Pol
 Hugh of Champlitte
 Hugo Etherianis
 Humayd ibn Ma'yuf al-Hajuri
 Huneric
 Hungary, Byzantine war with (1127–1129)
 Hungary, Byzantine war with (1180–1185)
 Hungary, Kingdom of
 Hungary, Principality of
 Hyelion and Leimocheir, Battle of
 Hypatia
 Hypatius
 Hypatos
 Hypatos ton philosophon
 Hyperpyron
 Hypodiastole

I

 Iacopo Barozzi
 Iacopo II Barozzi
 Iatrosophia
 Iberia (Caucasus)
 Iberia, Principate of
 Iberian War
 Ibn al-Faqih
 Ibn al-Ikhshad
 Ibn az-Zayyat (governor of Tarsus)
 Ibn Khordadbeh
 Ibn Mulhim
 Ibrahim Inal
 Icon
 Icon of the Annunciation, St. Catherine's Monastery
 Iconium
 Iconium, Metropolis of
 Iconodule
 Iconolatry
 Iconoclasm, Byzantine
 Idolatry
 Ignatios Glabas
 Ignatios the Deacon
 Ignatius, Patriarch of Constantinople
 Ignatius of Bulgaria
 Ikhtiyar al-Din Hasan ibn Ghafras
 Ildibad
 Illus
 Illyrian emperors
 Illyricum, Diocese of
 Illyricum, Praetorian prefecture of
 Immortals (Byzantine Empire)
 Imperial Library of Constantinople
 İnceğiz, Battle of
 Indiction
 Indulf (6th century)
 Innocent III, Pope of Rome
 Ino Anastasia
 Institutes of Justinian
 Insulae (Roman province)
 Ioakim Korsunianin
 Ioannina
 Ioannina Castle
 Ioannina, Chronicle of
 Iohannes (consul 467)
 Iohannis (epic poem)
 Irene Asanina
 Irene Doukaina
 Irene Gattilusio
 Irene Kantakouzene
 Irene Komnene Doukaina
 Irene Komnene Palaiologina
 Irene Laskarina
 Irene of Athens
 Irene of Brunswick
 Irene of Hungary
 Irene of Montferrat
 Irene of Trebizond
 Irene Palaiologina (Byzantine empress)
 Irene Palaiologina, Empress of Bulgaria
 Irene Palaiologina of Trebizond
 Irene Syrikaina
 Iron Bridge, Battle of the
 Isaac I Komnenos
 Isaac II Angelos
 Isaac Argyros
 Isaac Doukas Vatatzes
 Isaac Komnenos (brother of Alexios I)
 Isaac Komnenos (son of Alexios I)
 Isaac Komnenos (son of John II)
 Isaac Komnenos of Cyprus
 Isaac Komnenos Vatatzes
 Isaac Kontostephanos
 Isaac Laskaris
 Isaac the Armenian
 Isabella of Villehardouin
 Isaias, Patriarch of Constantinople
 Isaura Nea
 Isaura Palaea
 Isauria
 Isaurian War
 Isbul
 Isidore Glabas
 Isidore of Miletus
 Isidore I, Patriarch of Constantinople
 Islam, History of
 Islamic architecture
 Italo-Byzantine
 Italy, History of
 Ivan Alexander of Bulgaria
 Ivan Asen I of Bulgaria
 Ivan Asen II of Bulgaria
 Ivan Asen III of Bulgaria
 Ivanko of Bulgaria
 Ivan Shishman of Bulgaria
 Ivan Sratsimir of Bulgaria
 Ivan Stephen of Bulgaria
 Ivan the Russian
 Ivaylo of Bulgaria
 Ivaylo, Uprising of
 Iviron monastery
 Iyad (tribe)
 Iyad ibn Ghanm
 Izadgushasp

J

 Jabalah ibn al-Aiham
 Jabalah IV ibn al-Harith
 Jacob Baradaeus
 Jacopo Dondulo
 Jacopo Gattilusio
 Ja'far ibn Dinar al-Khayyat
 Jakob Philipp Fallmerayer
 James IV of Majorca
 James of Baux
 Jarrahids
 Jean Le Maingre
 Jerusalem
 Jerusalem, 536 Council of
 Jesus, Depiction of
 Jewish revolt against Constantius Gallus
 Jiajak Jaqeli
 Joachim of Korsun
 Joanna I of Naples
 Joan III, Countess of Burgundy
 Joannes Actuarius
 Joannes Zonaras
 Joannicius the Great
 John I, Archbishop of Cyprus
 John I (II), Coptic Patriarch of Alexandria
 John I Doukas of Thessaly
 John I Lemigius
 John I of Trebizond
 John I Orsini
 John I Tzimiskes
 John I Tzimiskes, Syrian campaigns of
 John II Doukas of Thessaly
 John II Komnenos
 John II of Naples
 John III of the Sedre
 John II of Trebizond
 John II Orsini
 John II Platinus
 John II (III), Coptic Patriarch of Alexandria
 John II, Patriarch of Constantinople
 John II, Bishop of Jerusalem
 John III Doukas Vatatzes
 John III of Naples
 John III of Trebizond
 John III Rizocopus
 John III Scholasticus, Patriarch of Constantinople
 John III, Pope of Rome
 John IV, Patriarch of Alexandria
 John IV Nesteutes, Patriarch of Constantinople
 John IV, Pope of Rome
 John IV Laskaris
 John IV of Naples
 John IV of Trebizond
 John V, Pope of Rome
 John V, Patriarch of Constantinople
 John V of Naples
 John V Palaiologos
 John VI Kantakouzenos
 John VI, Pope of Rome
 John VI, Patriarch of Constantinople
 John VII Grammatikos, Patriarch of Constantinople
 John VII, Pope of Rome
 John VII Palaiologos
 John VIII bar Abdoun
 John VIII Palaiologos
 John VIII Palaiologos, Medal of
 John VIII Xiphilinos, Patriarch of Constantinople
 John VIII, Pope of Rome
 John X Kamateros, Patriarch of Constantinople
 John XI Bekkos, Patriarch of Constantinople
 John XII, Patriarch of Constantinople
 John XIII Glykys, Patriarch of Constantinople
 John XIII, Pope of Rome
 John XIV Kalekas, Patriarch of Constantinople
 John XXII, Pope of Rome
 John (nephew of Vitalian)
 John Agapetus
 John Anagnostes
 John Angelos (protostrator)
 John Angelos (sebastokrator)
 John Angelus of Syrmia
 John Apokaukos
 John Apokaukos (died 1345)
 John Athalarichos
 John Axouch
 John Bagnell Bury
 John Belissariotes
 John Cassian
 John Chaldos
 John Chauderon
 John Chortasmenos
 John Choumnos
 John Chryselios
 John Chrysostom
 John Cottistis
 John de lo Cavo
 John Diakrinomenos
 John Doukas (Caesar)
 John Doukas (megas doux)
 John Doukas (sebastokrator)
 John Doukas (son of Michael II)
 John Doukas Angelos Palaiologos Raoul Laskaris Tornikes Philanthropenos Asen
 John Doukas (megas hetaireiarches)
 John Doukas Komnenos
 John Drimys
 John, Duke of Durazzo
 John Eladas
 John Eugenikos
 John Gabalas
 John Geometres
 John George Heracleus Basilicos[
 John Hagiopolites
 John Haldon
 John Ionopoulos
 John Ioubes
 John Ises
 John Italus
 John Julius Norwich
 John Kaloktenes
 John Kamateros (logothetes tou dromou)
 John Kammytzes
 John Kantakouzenos (Caesar)
 John Kantakouzenos (despot)
 John Kantakouzenos (pinkernes)
 John Kantakouzenos (sebastos)
 John Kladas
 John Komnenos (Domestic of the Schools)
 John Komnenos (governor of Dyrrhachium)
 John Komnenos (parakoimomenos)
 John Komnenos (son of Andronikos I)
 John Komnenos Doukas
 John Komnenos the Fat
 John Komnenos Vatatzes
 John Kontostephanos (son of Stephen)
 John Kourkouas
 John Kourkouas (9th century)
 John Kourkouas (catepan)
 John Kourkouas (died 971)
 John Kyparissiotes
 John Lazaropoulos
 John Malalas
 John Maron
 John Moschus
 John Mystacon
 John Mystikos
 John of Antioch (chronicler)
 John of Brienne
 John of Cappadocia
 John of Constantinople
 John of Conza
 John of Ephesus
 John of Epiphania
 John of Gaza
 John of Thebes
 John Palaiologos (brother of Michael VIII)
 John Palaiologos (Caesar)
 John Palaiologos (son of Andronikos II)
 John Pediasimos
 John Petraliphas
 John Phakrases
 John Phokas
 John Phrangopoulos
 John Pitzigaudes
 John Plytos
 John Proteuon
 John Raoul Petraliphas
 John Raphael
 John Rhadenos
 John Robert Martindale
 John Rogerios Dalassenos
 John Scholasticus
 John Spyridonakes
 John Synadenos (megas konostaulos)
 John Synadenos (megas stratopedarches)
 John Tarchaneiotes
 John Taronites (sebastos)
 John the Armenian
 John the Deacon (Byzantine writer)
 John the Cappadocian
 John the Eunuch (Trebizond)
 John the Exarch
 John the Hunchback
 John the Iberian
 John the Lydian
 John the Orphanotrophos
 John the Rhaiktor
 John the Scythian
 St. John, Basilica of (Ephesus)
 St. John the Theologian, Monastery of
 John Troglita
 John Tzelepes Komnenos
 John Tzetzes
 John Tzibus
 John Uroš
 John Vatatzes (megas stratopedarches)
 John W. Barker
 John Xenos
 Jordanes
 Joscelin of Molfetta
 Joseph I Galesiotes, Patriarch of Constantinople
 Joseph II, Patriarch of Constantinople
 Joseph Bringas
 Joseph Bryennios
 Joseph the Confessor
 Joshua Roll
 Jovan Oliver
 Jovan Uglješa
 Jovan Vladimir
 Jovian (emperor)
 Judham, Banu
 Judith Herrin
 Julian (emperor)
 Julian (I) of Antioch
 Julian II of Antioch
 Julian of Halicarnassus
 Julian's Persian expedition
 Julianus ben Sabar
 Juliopolis
 Julius Nepos
 Julius Nepos's wife
 Julius Patricius
 Junada ibn Abi Umayya al-Azdi
 Junayd of Aydın
 Junillus
 Jurisprudence
 Justa Grata Honoria
 Justin I
 Justin II
 Justin (Moesia)
 Justin (consul 540)
 Justin (magister militum per Illyricum)
 Justinian I
 Justinian II
 Justinian (magister militum per Orientem)
 Justinian dynasty
 Justiniana Prima
 Justiniana Prima, Archbishopric of

K

 Kabbadion
 Kaisariani Monastery
 Kalamata
 Kalavrye
 Kalavrye, Battle of
 Kalavryta, Barony of
 Kalb, Banu
 Kalbids
 Kalenderhane Mosque
 Kaliman I of Bulgaria
 Kalokyros
 Kalokyros Delphinas
 Kaloyan of Bulgaria
 Kamytzes
 Kanalites
 Kandik
 Kanikleios
 Kanstresios
 Kantakouzenos
 Kantara Castle
 Kaper Koraon Treasure
 Karabisianoi
 Karakabaklı
 Karakalou monastery
 Karaman Castle
 Karbeas
 Kardarigan (6th century)
 Kardarigan (7th century)
 Kardia, Battle of
 Karl Eduard Zachariae von Lingenthal
 Karl Hopf (historian)
 Karl Krumbacher
 Karykes
 Karytaina, Barony of
 Kassandreia
 Kassia
 Kassiopi Castle
 Kastoria
 Kastrophylax
 Kastro tis Orias (ballad)
 Katakalon
 Katakalon Kekaumenos
 Kata of Georgia
 Katasyrtai, Battle of
 Katepano
 Kaykhusraw I
 Kaysites
 Kavad I
 Kavad II
 Kecharitomene Monastery
 Kefeli Mosque
 Kephale
 Kerak
 Keramaia, Battle of
 Keratsa of Bulgaria
 Kesta Styppiotes
 Khazars
 Khosrow I
 Khosrow II
 Khurramites
 Khwarrahbud
 Kiev
 Kievan Rus'
 Kilij Arslan I
 Kilij Arslan II
 Kilij Arslan III
 Kızıl Kilise
 Kleidion, Battle of
 Kleisoura (Byzantine district)
 Kletorologion
 Klimova Treasure
 Klivanion
 Klokotnitsa, Battle of
 Koca Mustafa Pasha Mosque
 Kočapar Branislavljević
 Koine Greek
 Kokkinobaphos Master
 Koloneia on the Lykos
 Koloneia (theme)
 Kommata
 Kommerkiarios
 Komnene, daughter of Alexios I of Trebizond
 Komnenian Byzantine army
 Komnenion, Monastery of
 Komnenos
 Konostaulos
 Konstamonitou Monastery
 Konstantinos Amantos
 Konstantios Doukas
 Kontakion
 Kontoleon Tornikios
 Kontoskalion
 Kontostephanos
 Kopidnadon, Battle of
 Korymbos (headgear)
 Kos
 Köse Mihal
 Kosmidion
 Kosmidion, Battle of
 Kouboukleisios
 Kouropalates
 Kourtikios
 Krasos, Battle of
 Krateros (strategos of the Cibyrrhaeots)
 Krenites Arotras
 Kritai katholikoi
 Krum
 Ktenia (fortress)
 Kursi, Sea of Galilee
 Kursich
 Kykkos Monastery
 Kyklobion
 Kyros of Constantinople

L

 Ladislaus II of Hungary
 Lady of Neuville
 Laguatan
 Lalakaon, Battle of
 Lamentatio sanctae matris ecclesiae Constantinopolitanae
 Lamia (city)
 Lampsacus
 Lampsacus Treasure
 Landulf I of Benevento
 Landulf II of Benevento
 Landulf IV of Benevento
 Landulf V of Benevento
 Laodicea in Syria
 Laodicea in Syria, 636 Siege of
 Laodicea on the Lycus
 Laodicea on the Lycus, 1119 Siege of
 Lardea
 Large Sakkos of Photius
 Larissa
 Larissa, Battle of
 Laskaris
 Laskaris Kananos
 Late antiquity
 Late Greek
 Latin Emperor
 Latin Empire
 Latin Empire, Nicaean wars with the
 Law, Byzantine
 Law, Roman
 Lazar of Serbia
 Lazaros of Mount Galesios
 Lazarus Zographos
 St. Lazarus (Larnaca), Church of
 Lazia (theme)
 Lazica
 Lazic War
 Leander of Seville
 Lekapenos
 Lemnos
 Lemnos, 1024 Battle of
 Leo I (emperor)
 Leo, Column of
 Leo I, Pope of Rome
 Leo I, Prince of Armenia
 Leo I, King of Armenia
 Leo II (emperor)
 Leo II, Pope of Rome
 Leo II Mung
 Leo III the Isaurian
 Leo III, Pope of Rome
 Leo IV the Khazar
 Leo V the Armenian
 Leo VI the Wise
 Leo Apostyppes
 Leo Argyros (9th century)
 Leo Argyros (10th century)
 Leo Chamaidrakon
 Leo Choirosphaktes
 Leo Diogenes
 Leo Gabalas
 Leo Kalothetos
 Leoluca
 Leo of Chalcedon
 Leo of Ohrid
 Leo of Synada
 Leo Paraspondylos
 Leo Passianos
 Leo Phokas the Elder
 Leo Phokas the Younger
 Leo Rhabdouchos
 Leo Sakellarios
 Leo Sarakenopoulos
 Leo Scepter
 Leo Sgouros
 Leo Styppes, Patriarch of Constantinople
 Leo the Deacon
 Leo the Mathematician
 Leo the Physician
 Leo Tornikios
 Leo Tornikios Kontoleon
 Leo Tuscus
 Leon I of Abkhazia
 Leon II of Abkhazia
 Leonard of Chios
 Leonardo I Tocco
 Leonardo II Tocco
 Leonardo III Tocco
 Leonid dynasty
 Leontia (daughter of Leo I)
 Leontia
 Leontios
 Leontios of Neapolis
 Leontius, Patriarch of Constantinople
 Leontius (usurper)
 Leontius of Bulgaria
 Leontius of Damascus
 Leontius of Jerusalem
 Leontios Theotokites
 Lesbos
 Lesbos, Ottoman conquest of
 Leslie Brubaker
 Levant, History of the
 Levounion, Battle of
 Łewond
 Libadarios
 Liberatus of Carthage
 Liberius (praetorian prefect)
 Licario
 Licinia Eudoxia
 Lidoriki
 Limburg Staurotheke
 Limitanei
 Limnia (Pontus)
 Lindos
 Liparit IV, Duke of Kldekari
 Literature, Byzantine
 Little Hagia Sophia
 Liutprand, King of the Lombards
 Liutprand of Benevento
 Liutprand of Cremona
 Liuvigild
 Livias
 Ljutovid of Zahumlje
 Lochagos
 Loci communes (Pseudo-Maximus)
 Logariastes
 Logothete
 Logothetes ton agelon
 Logothetes ton oikeiakon
 Logothetes tou dromou
 Logothetes tou genikou
 Logothetes tou praitoriou
 Logothetes tou stratiotikou
 Lombards
 Lombard–Gepid War (567)
 Lombards, Byzantine wars with the
 Longibardopoulos
 Longinus (consul 486)
 Longinus (missionary)
 Longinus of Cardala
 Longinus of Selinus
 Longobardia
 Long Wall (Thracian Chersonese)
 Lopadion
 Loros
 Losorion
 Louis I, Count of Blois
 Louis I, Duke of Bourbon
 Louis VII of France
 Louis Bréhier
 Louis of Burgundy
 Louis, Prince of Taranto
 Loukas Notaras
 Loulon
 Louloudies
 Lucania (theme)
 Lucillianus (fleet commander)
 Lucillianus (magister equitum)
 Lucius (consul 413)
 Luke Chrysoberges, Patriarch of Constantinople
 Luke of Steiris
 Lu'lu' al-Kabir
 Lupus Protospatharius
 Lykandos
 Lyon, Second Council of
 Lyra, Byzantine

M

 Macarius of Egypt
 Macarius, Patriarch of Constantinople
 Macedonia (region)
 Macedonia (theme)
 Macedonia, Diocese of
 Macedonian art (Byzantine)
 Macedonian dynasty
 Macedonian Renaissance
 Macedonius I, Bishop of Constantinople
 Macedonius II, Patriarch of Constantinople
 Macedonius of Thessalonica
 Madaba Map
 Madonna di sant'Alessio
 Magical Treatise of Solomon
 Magister militum
 Magister officiorum
 Magistros
 Magnaura
 Mahbod (envoy)
 Al-Mahdi
 Maiuma
 Majorian
 Makarios Melissenos
 Makarios of Pelekete
 Makrembolites
 Makrinitissa Monastery
 Makroioannes
 Makryplagi, Battle of
 Malagina
 Malakasioi
 Malamirovo Inscription
 Maleinos
 Małgorzata Dąbrowska
 Malian Gulf earthquake, 551
 Malik ibn Kaydar
 Malik-Shah I
 Malik Shah (Rûm)
 Malta, Byzantine
 Mamas (Hun prince)
 Mamas, Monastery of St.
 Mamistra, Battle of
 Mammes, Battle of
 al-Ma'mun
 Manastır Mosque, Istanbul
 Mandator
 Mandylion
 Mangana (Constantinople)
 Manglabites
 Manjutakin
 Mani Peninsula
 Manichaeism
 Manolis Hatzidakis
 al-Mansur
 Mansur ibn Lu'lu'
 Mansur ibn Sarjun
 Manuel I Komnenos
 Manuel I of Trebizond
 Manuel II Palaiologos
 Manuel II, Patriarch of Constantinople
 Manuel II of Trebizond
 Manuel III of Trebizond
 Manuel Anemas
 Manuel Angelos Philanthropenos
 Manuel Bochalis
 Manuel Boutoumites
 Manuel Bryennios
 Manuel Charitopoulos
 Manuel Chrysaphes
 Manuel Chrysoloras
 Manuel Erotikos Komnenos
 Manuel Fokas
 Manuel Holobolos
 Manuel Kalekas
 Manuel Kamytzes
 Manuel Kantakouzenos
 Manuel Kantakouzenos (usurper)
 Manuel Komnenos (kouropalates)
 Manuel Komnenos (son of Andronikos I)
 Manuel Komnenos Doukas
 Manuel Komnenos Raoul
 Manuel Kourtikes
 Manuel Maurozomes
 Manuel Moschopoulos
 Manuel Opsaras Dishypatos
 Manuel Palaiologos
 Manuel Panselinos
 Manuel Raoul
 Manuel Tagaris
 Manuel the Armenian
 Manuele Zaccaria
 Manzikert
 Manzikert, Battle of
 Manzikert, 1054 Battle of
 Maraj-al-Debaj, Battle of
 Marash, 953 Battle of
 Marcellae, Battle of
 Marcellae, 756 Battle of
 Marcellinus Comes
 Marcello Tegalliano
 Marcellus (general under Justinian I)
 Marcellus (comes excubitorum)
 Marcellus (brother of Justin II)
 Marcia Euphemia
 Marcian
 Marcian (cousin of Justin II)
 Marcian (usurper)
 Marcian of Heraclea
 Marcianopolis
 Marco Angeli
 Marco Bembo
 Marcus (son of Basiliscus)
 Mardaite revolts
 Mardaites
 Margaret Mullett
 Margaret of Hungary
 Margaret of Burgundy, Queen of Sicily
 Margaret of Durazzo
 Margaret of Villehardouin
 Maria (daughter of Maurice)
 Maria (empress)
 Maria, wife of Leo III
 Maria, wife of Constantine V
 Maria Angelina Doukaina Palaiologina
 Maria Argyropoulina
 Maria-Irene Palaiologina
 Maria Komnene (daughter of Alexios I)
 Maria Komnene (daughter of Manuel I)
 Maria Komnene, Queen of Hungary
 Maria Komnene, Queen of Jerusalem
 Mariam (daughter of Bagrat IV of Georgia)
 Maria of Alania
 Maria of Amnia
 Maria of Antioch
 Maria of Bulgaria
 Maria of Bulgaria, Latin Empress
 Maria of Calabria
 Maria of Gothia
 Maria of Mangup
 Maria of Trebizond
 Maria Palaiologina
 Maria Palaiologina, Queen of Serbia
 Maria Palaiologina Kantakouzene
 Maria Petraliphaina
 Marianos Argyros
 Marie de Bourbon, Princess of Achaea
 Marie of Brienne
 Marie of Champagne
 Marie de Courtenay
 Marino Dandolo
 Marinus I, Pope of Rome
 Marinus I of Naples
 Marinus II of Naples
 Marinus (praetorian prefect)
 Marios Philippides
 Marj Rahit (634), Battle of
 Markos Palaiologos Iagaris
 Mark Whittow
 Marmara Sea
 Marmaritzana
 Maronite Church
 Marriage Charter of Empress Theophanu
 Martin (magister militum per Armeniam)
 Martin I, Pope of Rome
 Martin IV, Pope of Rome
 Martina (empress)
 Martino Zaccaria
 Martinus (son of Heraclius)
 Martorana
 Martyropolis
 Martyropolis, 502 Siege of
 Martyropolis, 531 Siege of
 Martyropolis, 588 Battle of
 Maruli
 Maruzas
 Marwanids
 Mary of Avesnes
 Mary of Egypt
 Mary of Hungary, Queen of Naples
 Mary the Younger
 Mary, Church of (Ephesus)
 St. Mary Peribleptos, Church of
 St. Mary of Blachernae (Istanbul), Church of
 St. Mary of the Mongols, Church of
 St. Mary of the Spring (Istanbul), Church of
Mary's Well
 Maslama ibn Abd al-Malik
 Maslama ibn Hisham
 Maslama ibn Mukhallad al-Ansari
 Mastaura (Caria)
 Mastaura (Lycia)
 al-Masudi
 Masuna
 Matasuntha
 Maternus Cynegius
 Matilda of Hainaut
 Matthew I, Patriarch of Constantinople
 Matthew Blastares
 Matthew Kantakouzenos
 Matthew Palaiologos Asen
 Matzouka
 Maurice
 Maurice's Balkan campaigns
 Maurice Spata
 Maurikios Chartoularios
 Maurizio Galbaio
 Maurocastrum
 Mauropotamos, Battle of
 Mauro-Roman Kingdom
 Mauros
 Mausoleum of Galla Placidia
 Maximianus, Archbishop of Constantinople
 Maximianus of Ravenna
 Maximos Kausokalybites
 Maximos Planoudes
 Maximus I, Archbishop of Constantinople
 Maximus II, Patriarch of Constantinople
 Maximus the Confessor
 Medicine, Byzantine
 Medieval architecture
 Medieval Greek
 Medikion monastery
 Medina, 1053–54 Siege of
 Megara, 1359 Battle of
 Megas adnoumiastes 
 Megas archon
 Megas dioiketes
 Megas domestikos
 Megas doux
 Megas logariastes
 Megas logothetes
 Megas stratopedarches
 Megas tzaousios
 Mehmed I
 Mehmed II
 Melantias
 Melantias, Battle of
 Meletios the Younger
 Melias
 Melias (Domestic of the Schools)
 Melingoi
 Melissenos
 Melite (ancient city)
 Melite, 870 Siege of
 Melitene
 Melkite
 Melenikon
 Melus of Bari
 Memnon of Ephesus
 Menander Protector
 Menas, Patriarch of Constantinople
 Menaulion
 Menologion of Basil II
 Menteshe
 Merarches
 Merena
 Merobaudes (magister peditum)
 Merope (region)
 Mesazon
 Mese (Constantinople)
 Mesopotamia (Roman province)
 Mesopotamia (theme)
 Mesud I
 Meteora
 Methodius I, Patriarch of Constantinople
 Methodius II, Patriarch of Constantinople
 Methoni, Messenia
 Metrophanes II, Patriarch of Constantinople
 Michael I Rangabe
 Michael I Cerularius, Patriarch of Constantinople
 Michael I Komnenos Doukas
 Michael II
 Michael II Kourkouas, Patriarch of Constantinople
 Michael II Komnenos Doukas
 Michael III
 Michael III, Patriarch of Constantinople
 Michael IV the Paphlagonian
 Michael IV Autoreianus, Patriarch of Constantinople
 Michael V
 Michael VI Bringas
 Michael VII Doukas
 Michael VIII Palaiologos
 Michael IX Palaiologos
 Michael (son of Anastasios the logothete)
 Michael Angold
 Michael Apokapes
 Michael Apostolius
 Michael Apsaras
 Michael Asen I of Bulgaria
 Michael Aspietes
 Michael Astrapas and Eutychios
 Michael Attaleiates
 Michael Choniates
 Michael Choumnos
 Michael Dermokaites
 Michael Dokeianos
 Michael Doukas (protostrator)
 Michael Doukas Glabas Tarchaneiotes
 Michael Gabras
 Michael Glykas
 Michael Italikos
 Michael Kaballarios
 Michael Kantakouzenos (died 1316)
 Michael Kantakouzenos (died 1264)
 Michael Kourtikios
 Michael Lachanodrakon
 Michael Maleinos
 Michael Maurex
 Michael Melissenos
 Michael Monomachos
 Michael of Synnada
 Michael of Trebizond
 Michael Palaiologos (general)
 Michael Palaiologos (son of Andronikos III)
 Michael Palaiologos (son of John V)
 Michael Panaretos
 Michael Protospatharios
 Michael Psellos
 Michael Spondyles
 Michael Stryphnos
 Michael Stypiotes
 Michael Synkellos
 Michael Tarchaneiotes
 Michael Taronites
 Michael Toxaras
 Michaelaton
 Michaelion
 Middle Ages
 Middle Eastern archaeology
 Mihailo Vojislavljević
 Mihaloğlu Mehmed Bey
 Mihr-Mihroe
 Milazzo, 888 Battle of
 Miletus
 Miletus, Metropolis of
 Miliaresion
 Milion
 Military manuals, Byzantine
 Minervina
 Mints, Byzantine
 Miracles of Saint Demetrius
 Mirdasid dynasty
 Miriarcha
 Miroslava of Bulgaria
 Missorium of Theodosius I
 Mitato
 Mitso Asen of Bulgaria
 Mixobarbaroi
 Mizizios
 Mjej II Gnuni
 Mleh, Prince of Armenia
 Mocius, Cistern of
 Modestus, Patriarch of Jerusalem
 Moesia
 Moglena
 Moira (military)
 Mokissos
 Momchil
 Monastery of Saint George, Skyros
 Monasticism
 Monaxius
 Mongols, Byzantine alliance with the
 Mongol invasion of the Latin Empire
 Monemvasia
 Monemvasia, Chronicle of
 Monoenergism
 Monomachos (Byzantine family)
 Monomachus Crown
 Monophysitism
 Monothelitism
 Monreale
 Mons Lactarius, Battle of
 Montemaggiore, Battle of
 Montepeloso, Battle of
 Monza ampullae
 Mopsuestia
 Morea
 Morea, Chronicle of the
 Morea, Despotate of the
 Morea revolt of 1453–1454
 Mosaic Fragment with Man Leading a Giraffe
 Mosaics
 Mosaics in the Middle East, Early Byzantine
 Moses the Black
 Mosynopolis
 Motella
 Mount Athos
 Moutalaske
 Mouzalon
 Mtskheta
 Muawiyah I
 Mu'awiya ibn Hisham
 Mucellium, Battle of
 Mufarrij ibn Daghfal ibn al-Jarrah
 Muflih (eunuch)
 Muflih al-Saji
 Muhammad ibn Marwan
 Muhammad ibn Shu'ayb al-Zarkun
 Muhammad ibn Tughj al-Ikhshid
 Mu'izz al-Dawla Thimal
 al-Mundhir III ibn al-Nu'man
 al-Mundhir III ibn al-Harith
 Mundus (magister militum)
 Mu'nis al-Muzaffar
 Muntaner, Chronicle of
 Muqallid ibn Kamil
 al-Muqtadir
 Murad I
 Murad II
 Music, Byzantine
 Musokios
 Mu'tah, Battle of
 al-Mu'tasim
 al-Mutawakkil
 Mutimir of Serbia
 Mutinensis gr. 122
 Mylasa and Melanoudion
 Myrelaion Monastery
 Myriokephalon, Battle of
 Mystikos
 Mystras

N

 Nabedes
 Nachoragan
 Naissus
 Naja al-Kasaki
 Nakip Mosque
 Nakoleia
 Naples
 Naples, Duchy of
 Naples, 536 Siege of
 Naples, 542–543 Siege of
 Narentines
 Narjot de Toucy (died 1241)
 Narses
 Narses (comes)
 Narses (magister militum per Orientem)
 Nasar
 Nasr al-Thamali
 Nativity, Church of the
 Naum of Ohrid
 Naupaktos
 Naupaktos, Metropolis of
 Nauplion
 Navarrese Company
 Navy, Byzantine
 Naxos
 Naxos, Duchy of
 Nea Ekklesia
 Nea Ekklesia of the Theotokos
 Nea Moni of Chios
 Near Eastern archaeology
 Neboulos
 Nectarius, Patriarch of Constantinople
 Negroponte, Triarchy of
 Neilos Doxapatres
 Neilos Kabasilas
 Nemanjić dynasty
 Neocaesarea
 Neokastra
 Neopatras
 Neopatras, Battle of
 Neopatria, Duchy of
 Neophytos, Basilica of St.
 Neophytus I, Patriarch of Constantinople
 Neoplatonism
 Neorion Harbour
 Neoterius
 Nephon I, Patriarch of Constantinople
 Nestorianism
 Nestor Iskander's Tale on the Taking of Tsargrad
 Nestorius
 New Rome
 Nicaea
 Nicaea, 1st Council of
 Nicaea, 2nd Council of
 Nicaea, Empire of
 Nicaea, Metropolis of
 Nicaea, 727 Siege of
 Nicaea, 1097 Siege of
 Nicaea, 1113 Siege of
 Nicaea, 1328–1331 Siege of
 Nicaean–Venetian treaty of 1219
 Niccolò Gattilusio, Lord of Ainos
Nicene Creed
 Nicephorus I, Patriarch of Constantinople
 Nicephorus II, Patriarch of Constantinople
 Nicetas (cousin of Heraclius)
 Nicetas I, Patriarch of Constantinople
 Nicetas II Mountanes, Patriarch of Constantinople
 Nicetas of Heraclea
 Nicetas the Paphlagonian
 Nicetas the Patrician, Saint
 Nicholas I Mystikos, Patriarch of Constantinople
 Nicholas II Chrysoberges, Patriarch of Constantinople
 Nicholas II, Pope of Rome
 Nicholas III Grammatikos, Patriarch of Constantinople
 Nicholas III of Saint Omer
 Nicholas IV Mouzalon, Patriarch of Constantinople
 Nicholas Adontz
 Nicholas Eudaimonoioannes
 Nicholas Hagiotheodorites
 Nicholas Kabasilas
 Nicholas Kallikles
 Nicholas Kanabos
 Nicholas le Maure
 Nicholas Maliasenos
 Nicholas Mesarites
 Nicholas of Methone
 Nicholas of Myra
 Nicholas of Stoudios
 Saint Nicholas of the Roof, Church of
 Saint Nicholas Orphanos, Church of
 Nicholas Orsini
 Nicholas Picingli
 Nicomedia
 Nicomedia, Metropolis of
 Nicomedia, Siege of
 Nicopolis
 Nicopolis (Pontus)
 Nicopolis (theme)
 Nicopolis ad Istrum
 Nicopolis ad Nestum
 Nicopolis earthquake, 499
 Nicopsis
 Nika riots
 Nikephorian dynasty
 Nikephoritzes
 Nikephoros I
 Nikephoros I Komnenos Doukas
 Nikephoros II Orsini
 Nikephoros II Phokas
 Nikephoros III Botaneiates
 Nikephoros (Caesar)
 Nikephoros (son of Artabasdos)
 Nikephoros Basilakes
 Nikephoros Bryennios (ethnarch)
 Nikephoros Bryennios the Elder
 Nikephoros Bryennios the Younger
 Nikephoros Choumnos
 Nikephoros Chrysoberges
 Nikephoros Diogenes
 Nikephoros Dokeianos
 Nikephoros Gregoras
 Nikephoros Kabasilas
 Nikephoros Kallistos Xanthopoulos
 Nikephoros Katakalon
 Nikephoros Komnenos
 Nikephoros Komnenos (brother of Alexios I)
 Nikephoros Lykaon
 Nikephoros Melissenos
 Nikephoros Ouranos
 Nikephoros Palaiologos
 Nikephoros Parsakoutenos
 Nikephoros Phokas the Elder
 Nikephoros Phokas Barytrachelos
 Nikephoros Proteuon
 Nikephoros Tarchaneiotes
 Nikephoros the Monk
 Nikephoros Xiphias
 Niketas (son of Artabasdos)
 Niketas (son of Ioube)
 Niketas Abalantes
 Niketas Chalkoutzes
 Niketas Choniates
 Niketas David Paphlagon
 Niketas Ooryphas
 Niketas Scholares
 Niketas the Persian
 Niketas Triphyllios
 Nikiou, Battle of
 Nikolaos Oikonomides
 Nikolaos Philanthropinos
 Nikon of the Black Mountain
 Nikon the Metanoeite
 Nilus Kerameus, Patriarch of Constantinople
 Nilus of Rossano
 Nina Garsoïan
 Nineveh, 627 Battle of
 Niphon Kausokalybites
 Nipsistiarios
 Nisibis
 Nisibis, 573 Siege of
 Nobilissimus
 Nomisma
 Nomophylax
 Nonnosus (historian)
 Normans
 Normans, Byzantine wars with the
 Norman conquest of southern Italy
 North Africa during Antiquity
 Nostra Segnora de Mesumundu
 Notarios
 Notitia Dignitatum
 Notitia Urbis Constantinopolitanae
 Noumeroi
 Novae
 Novel (Roman law)
 Novel, Byzantine
 Novellae Constitutiones
 Noviodunum
 Al-Nu'man VI ibn al-Mundhir
 Numayrid dynasty
 Nymphaeum, 1214 Treaty of
 Nymphaeum, 1261 Treaty of
 Nymphaion (Ionia)
 Nyssa (Cappadocia)

O

 Obelerio degli Antenori
 Obelisk of Theodosius
 Octoechos
 Odalar Mosque
 Odo IV, Duke of Burgundy
 Odoacer
 Odolgan
 Oecumenius
 Ohrid
 Oikeios
  Oikonomos
 Olbia, Libya
 Old Church Slavonic
 Old Metropolis, Veroia
 Oleg of Novgorod
 Olena, Bishopric of
 Olga of Kiev
 Olivento, Battle of
 Olybrius (consul 491)
Olympias (daughter of Robert Guiscard)
 Olympiodorus the Younger
 Olympius (exarch)
 Omophorion
 Omphalion
 Omurtag of Bulgaria
Onegesius
Onoguris, Siege of
 Onoulphus
 Opsikion
 Opsites of Lazica
 Optimatoi
 Orhan
 Orestes (prefect)
Orestes, Patriarch of Jerusalem
 Origen
 Orion of Thebes
 Oros of Alexandria
 Orphanotrophos
 Orsini family
 Orso I Participazio
 Orso II Participazio
 Orso Ipato
 Oshin of Lampron
 Osman I
 Osroene
 Ostiarios
 Ostrogothic Kingdom
 Ostrogoths
 Otto I, Holy Roman Emperor
 Otto II, Holy Roman Emperor
 Otto III, Holy Roman Emperor
 Otto, Duke of Brunswick-Grubenhagen
 Ottoman Empire
 Ottoman Empire, Byzantine wars with the
 Ottoman Empire, Rise of the
 Ottoman Interregnum
 Oxford Dictionary of Byzantium
 Öz Beg Khan

P

 Paganino Doria
 Painted churches in Cyprus, List of
 Painted Churches in the Troödos Region
 Palace of the Porphyrogenitus
 Pala d'Oro
 Palaestina Prima
 Palaestina Salutaris
 Palaestina Secunda
 Palaiologos
 Palaiologos-Montferrat
 Palaiologan Renaissance
 Palamede Gattilusio
 Palamism
 Paleologo Zaccaria
 Palermo
 Palestine
 Palladius of Galatia
 Pammakaristos Church
 Pammegistoi Taxiarches church
 Pamphylia
 Pamprepius
 Panagia
 Panagia Apsinthiotissa
 Panagia Atheniotissa, Church of
 Panagia Chalkeon, Church of
 Panagia Episkopi
 Panagia Kapnikarea, Church of
 Panagia Kera, Church of
 Panagia Kontariotissa
 Panagia Limeniotissa, Basilica of
 Panagia Mavriotissa, Monastery of
 Panagia Molyvdoskepastos, Monastery of
 Panagia Olympiotissa Monastery
 Panagia Pantobasilissa church, Tirilye
 Panagia Protothronos, Church of
 Panagia Theoskepasti, Church of (Cyprus)
 Panagia Theoskepastos Monastery (Trebizond)
 Panagia tis Angeloktistis
 Panagia tou Araka
 Pandulf Ironhead
 Pandulf IV of Capua
 Pandulf V of Capua
 Panhypersebastos
 Pankaleia, Battle of
 Pannonia (Roman province)
 Panormus, Siege of
 Pantaleone Barbo
 Pantanassa (Athens), Church of the
 Pantanassa Monastery
 Panteleimon (Gorno Nerezi), Church of St.
 Panteleimon (Thessaloniki), Church of Saint
 Pantokrator Monastery
 Pantokratoros monastery
 Paolo Cesaretti
 Paolo Lucio Anafesto
 Paphlagonia
 Paphlagonia (theme)
 Paphlagonian expedition of the Rus'
 Papias (Byzantine office)
 Parabalani
 Paradynasteuon
 Parakoimomenos
 Paramonai
 Paraphylax
 Saint Paraskevi, Monastery of (Vikos)
 Parastaseis syntomoi chronikai
 Parathalassites
 Pardos
 Parecclesion
 Paregoritissa, Church of the
 Paris Psalter
 Paristrion
 Paroikoi
 Partitio terrarum imperii Romaniae
 Passavant, Barony of
 Pastophorion
 Patara (Lycia)
 Patmos
 Patras
 Patras, Barony of
 Patras, Latin Archbishopric of
 Patras (805 or 807), Siege of
 Patria of Constantinople
 Patriarch of Constantinople
 Patricia Clementina
 Patricius (consul 500)
 Patrikios
 Paul I, Bishop of Constantinople
 Paul I, Pope of Rome
 Paul II, Patriarch of Constantinople
 Paul II the Black of Alexandria
 Paul III, Patriarch of Constantinople
 Paul IV, Patriarch of Constantinople
 Paul of Alexandria, Patriarch
 Paul, Latin Patriarch of Constantinople
 Paul (father of Maurice)
 Paul (exarch)
 Paul Lemerle
 Paul of Aegina
 Paul of Xeropotamou
 Paul Magdalino
 Paul Palaiologos Tagaris
 Paul the Silentiary
 Paulicianism
 Paulus (consul 496)
 Paulus (consul 512)
 Pausicacus of Synada
 Pavle of Serbia
 Pechenegs
 Pecheneg Revolt
 Pedro de San Superano
 Pegae, Battle of
 Pegonites
 Pelagianism
 Pelagius I, Pope of Rome
 Pelagius II, Pope of Rome
 Pelagonia, Battle of
 Pelekanon, Battle of
 Pelekete monastery
 Peloponnese
 Peloponnese (theme)
 Peltast
 Pentapolis, Duchy of the
 Pentarchy
 Peranius
 Perbundos
 Perctarit
 Perenos
 Peribleptos Monastery, Mystras
 Pereyaslavets
 Pergamon
 Pergamon, Metropolis of
 Peritheorion
 Peritheorion, Battle of
 Perozes
 Perugia, Duchy of
 Petar of Serbia
 Peter, Patriarch of Constantinople
 Peter (usurper)
 Peter (curopalates)
 Peter I of Bulgaria
 Peter II of Bulgaria
 Peter II of Courtenay
 Peter III of Raqqa
 Peter IV, Coptic Patriarch of Alexandria
 Peter (stratopedarches)
 Peter Barsymes
 Peter Bua
 Peter Charanis
 Peter Delyan
 Peter Delyan, Uprising of
 Peter Megaw
 Peter of Apamea
 Peter of Diokleia
 Peter of Damascus
 Peter of Goulaion
 Peter the Hermit
 Peter the Patrician
 Peter the Patrician (9th century)
 Peter the Wonderworker
 Petra, Lazica
 Petra, 541 Siege of
 Petra, 549 Siege of
 Petra, 550–551 Siege of
 Petraki Monastery
 Petraliphas
 Petroe, Battle of
 Petronas (general)
 Petronas Kamateros
 Petrus Siculus
 Petzeas
 Phanagoria
 Pharas the Herulian
 Pharsalus, 1277 Battle of
 Phasis
 Phasis, Siege of
 Philadelphia
 Philadelphia, Fall of
 Philadelphia, Metropolis of
 Philadelphion
 Philagathus of Cerami
 Philanthropenos
 Philaretos Brachamios
 Phileremos, Icon of Our Lady of
 Philip of Swabia
 Philip of Courtenay
 Philip I, Prince of Taranto
 Philip I of Piedmont
 Philip II, Prince of Taranto
 Philip Monotropos
 Philippa of Armenia
 Philippi
 Philippi, Metropolis of
 Philippicus (comes excubitorum)
 Philippikos Bardanes
 Philippus, Flavius
 Philopatris
 Philosophy, Byzantine
 Philotheou monastery
 Philotheos I Kokkinos, Patriarch of Constantinople
 Phocas
 Phoenice (Roman province)
 Phokas (Byzantine family)
 Phosterius
 Photeinos (strategos)
 Photian schism
 Photice
 Photinus of Thessalonica
 Photios I the Great, Patriarch of Constantinople
 Photios (Emirate of Crete)
 Phoulkon
 Phoulloi
 Phrygia
 Phthiotic Thebes
 Pietro Angeli
 Pietro Loredan
 Pietro Paleologo Mastrogiovanni
 Pietro Polani
 Pietro Tradonico
 Pinkernes
 Placidia
 Placidia Palace
 Planudes, Anthology of
 Plato (exarch)
 Plato of Sakkoudion
 Plinta
 Pliska
 Pliska, Battle of
 Plotinopolis
 Poemen
 Poimanenon, Battle of
 Poliorcetica
 Polyeuctus, Patriarch of Constantinople
 St. Polyeuctus, Church of
 Polyphengos
 Pompeius
 Pontikokastro
 Pontus
 Pontus, Diocese of
 Population of the Byzantine Empire
 Porphyrios (whale)
 Porphyrius the Charioteer
 Porta Panagia
 Portrait of the Four Tetrarchs
 Pothos Argyros (11th century)
 Pothos Argyros (Domestic of the Schools)
 Poutza
 Praecepta Militaria
 Praejecta
 Praepositus sacri cubiculi
 Praeses
 Praetor
 Praetorian prefecture of the East
 Praulius of Jerusalem
 Preljub
 Presian I of Bulgaria
 Presian (son of Ivan Vladislav)
 Preslav
 Preslav Treasure
 Prespa (medieval town)
 Pribislav of Serbia
 Primicerius
 Prinitza, Battle of
 Prisca (empress)
 Priscian of Lydia
 Priscus
 Priscus (magister militum)
 Prison of Anemas
 Prisoner exchanges with the Arabs
 Problem of two emperors
 Probus (consul 502)
 Probus (consul 525)
 Prochoros Kydones
 Proclus, Archbishop of Constantinople
 Proclus Oneirocrites
 Procopius (usurper)
 Procopius (magister militum)
 Procopius Anthemius (emperor's son)
 Procopius of Caesarea
 Proedros
 Progonos Sgouros
 Prohor of Pčinja
 Prokathemenos
 Prokopia
 Promachos
 Pronoia
 Prophet Elijah (Thessaloniki), Church of
 Proskynesis
 Prosopographisches Lexikon der Palaiologenzeit
 Prosopography of the Byzantine World
 Prosopography of the Later Roman Empire
 Prosphorion Harbour
 Prostagma
 Protasekretis
 Prothesis (altar)
 Protoierakarios
 Protokynegos
 Protonotarios
 Protosebastohypertatos
 Protosebastos
 Protospatharios
 Protostates
 Protostrator
 Protovestiarios
 Protovestiarites
 Pseudo-Alexios II
 Pseudo-Joshua the Stylite
 Pseudo-Methodius, Apocalypse of
 Pseudo-Nonnus
 Pseudo-Simeon
 Psiloi
 Pteruges
 Ptolemais, Cyrenaica
 Pulcheria
 Pusaeus
 Pylai
 Pyrgion
 Pyrrhus, Patriarch of Constantinople

Q

 Qarghuyah
 Al-Qasim ibn Harun al-Rashid
 Qasr Ibn Wardan
 Quaesitor
 Quaestor sacri palatii
 Quaestura exercitus
 Qudama ibn Ja'far
 Quinisext Council
 Quintus Clodius Hermogenianus Olybrius
 Qutalmish

R

 Raban, Battle of
 Radelchis I of Benevento
 Radelchis II of Benevento
 Radoslav of Duklja
 Radu Cantacuzino
 Ragnaris
 Ragnvald Ingvarsson
 Ragusa
 Ragusa, 866–868 Siege of
 Raiktor
 Rainerio of Travale
 Rainulf Drengot
 Ralph-Johannes Lilie
 Raoul (Byzantine family)
 Rashid al-Dawla Mahmud
 Rashidun Caliphate
 Rashiq al-Nasimi
 Raška (region)
 Ravenna
 Ravenna, 729 Battle of
 Ravenna, Exarchate of
 Ravenna, 539–540 Siege of
 Raymond IV, Count of Toulouse
 Raymond-Joseph Loenertz
 Raymond of Poitiers
 Raynald of Châtillon
 Red Basilica
 Red Church (Bulgaria)
 Red Church (Vourgareli)
 Renaissance
 Renaissance, Greek scholars in the
 Rendakis
 Renier of Montferrat
 Renier of Trit
 Revue des études byzantines
 Rhahzadh
 Rhaiktor
 Rhapsomates
 Rhegion (Thrace)
 Rhetoric, Byzantine
 Rhetorius
 Rhodes
 Rhodes, Genoese occupation of
 Rhodes, Hospitaller conquest of
 Rhodes, Metropolis of
 Rhodian Sea Law
 Rhodope (Roman province)
 Rhodope Mountains
 Rhodopolis
 Rhynchinoi
 Rhyndacus, 1211 Battle of the
 Richard Orsini
 Richard I of England
 Ricimer
 Riniasa Castle
 Ripa Gothica
 Rishki Pass, Battle of the
 Rita of Armenia
 Riva Castle
 Robert III of Loritello
 Robert Browning (Byzantinist)
 Robert Crispin
 Robert Graves
 Robert Guiscard
 Robert of Ketton
 Robert of Courtenay
 Robert, Prince of Taranto
 Rodolphe Guilland
 Roger I of Sicily
 Roger II of Sicily
 Roger de Flor
 Rogoi
 Roman Empire
 Roman people
 Roman of Bulgaria
 Roman–Iranian relations
 Romana (Jordanes)
 Romanus (exarch)
 Romanos I Lekapenos
 Romanos II
 Romanos III Argyros
 Romanos IV Diogenes
 Romanos Argyros (10th century)
 Romanos Dalassenos
 Romanos Ivory
 Romanos Kourkouas
 Romanos the Melodist
 Romanus (exarch)
 Rome
 Rome, Duchy of
 Rome, 537–538 Siege of
 Rome, 546 Sack of
 Rome, 549–550 Siege of
 Rometta, Siege of
 Romilly James Heald Jenkins
 Romuald I of Benevento
 Romuald II of Benevento
 Romulus Augustulus
 Rosamund (wife of Alboin)
 Rossano Gospels
 Rothari
 Roussel de Bailleul
 Ruben I, Prince of Armenia
 Ruben II, Prince of Armenia
 Ruben III, Prince of Armenia
 Rubens vase
 Rufinus (consul)
 Rufinus (poet)
 Rufinus (relative of Theodosius II)
 Rûm
 Rum, Sultanate of
 Rumelia
 Rus' people
 Rus'–Byzantine Treaty (907)
 Rus'–Byzantine Treaty (911)
 Rus'–Byzantine Treaty (945)
 Rus'–Byzantine Wars
 Rus'–Byzantine War (941)
 Rus'–Byzantine War (1043)
 Rus' Khaganate
 Rus' Khaganate, Christianization of the
 Rusokastro, Battle of
 Rustam ibn Baradu
 Rusudan of Georgia, Empress of Trebizond
 Rynchines

S

 Sabas Asidenos
 Sabas of Stoudios
 Sabbas the Sanctified
 Sabinian, Pope of Rome
 Sabinianus (consul 505)
 Saborios
 Sacra Parallela
 Sacred Military Constantinian Order of Saint George
 Sa'd al-Dawla
 Safar, Treaty of
 Safwan ibn Muattal
 Sagudates
 Sahralanyozan
 Sa'id al-Dawla
 Sa'id ibn Abd al-Malik
 Sa'id ibn Hamdan
 Sa'id ibn Hisham
 Saint George, Battle of
 Saint George and the Princess
 Saints Theodore Tyro and Theodore Stratelates Church, Serres
 Sakellarios
 Saladin
 Salih ibn Ali
 Salih ibn Mirdas
 Salihids
 Salim ibn Asad ibn Abi Rashid
 Salona
 Salona, Lordship of
 Salutius
 Samaritan Revolts
 Samos (theme)
 Sampson the Hospitable
 Samuel of Bulgaria
 San Giovanni Theristis
 San Vittore alle Chiuse
 Sardinia, Byzantine
 Sardis
 Sardis, Byzantine churches at
 Sardis, See of
 Sarjun ibn Mansur
 Sarosius
 Sarukhan, Bey of Magnesia
 Sarus, Battle of
 Sasanian (589-591), civil war of
 Sasanian (628-632), civil war of
 Sasanian dynasty
 Sasanian Empire
 Sasanian Empire, Byzantine wars with the
 Sasanian Empire, military of the
 Sasireti, Battle of
 Satala, 530 Battle of
 Saviour, Church of the (Thessaloniki)
 Savoyard crusade
 Sayf al-Dawla
 Scardon, Battle of
 Scholae Palatinae
 Scholasticus
 Scholia Sinaitica
 Science, Byzantine
 Scipuar
 Sclaveni
 Sclaviniae
 Scottas
 Scriptor Incertus
 Scythia Minor
 Sea of Marmara earthquake, 542
 Seat of Mary, Church of the
 Sebasteia
 Sebasteia (theme)
 Sebastohypertatos
 Sebastokrator
 Sebastophoros
 Sebastopolis, Battle of
 Sebastos
 Sebukht
 Second Crusade
 Sekbanbaşı Mosque
 Seleucia
 Seleucia (theme)
 Selge
 Seljuk dynasty
 Seljuk Turks, Byzantine wars with the
 Sena Gallica, Battle of
 Senate, Byzantine
 Senekerim-Hovhannes Artsruni
 Sententiae Syriacae
 Septimius Acindynus
 Seraglio Octateuch
 Serbia, Byzantine
 Serbia, Byzantine wars with
 Serbia, 1090–1095 Byzantine war with
 Serbia, Early medieval principality of
 Serbia, Grand Principality of
 Serbia in the Middle Ages
 Serbia, Medieval Kingdom of
 Serbian Despotate
 Serbian Empire
 Serblias family
 Serbo-Byzantine architecture
 Sergius I, Pope of Rome
 Sergius-Tychicus
 Severinus, Pope of Rome
 Serdica, 809 Siege of
 Serena (wife of Stilicho)
 Sergey Karpov
 Sergios Niketiates
 Sergius I, Patriarch of Constantinople
 Sergius I, Pope of Rome
 Sergius I of Naples
 Sergius II, Patriarch of Constantinople
 Sergius II of Naples
 Sergius III of Naples
 Sergius IV of Naples
 Sergius (Byzantine general)
 Sergius of Reshaina
 Sergius of Tella
 Sergius of Valaam
 Sergius, Patrician of Lazica
 Serres, Battle of
 Setina, Battle of
 Settepozzi, Battle of
 Seventh Ecumenical Council
 Severianus of Damascus
 Severus of Antioch
 Şeyh Süleyman Mosque
 Sgouros Spata
 Shahin Vahmanzadegan
 Shahraplakan
 Shahrbaraz
 Shaizar, Siege of
 Shapur II
 Shapur III
 Shenoute
 Shibl al-Dawla Nasr
 Shirimni, Battle of
 Shirin
 Shivta
 Shu'ayb ibn Umar
 Sicard of Benevento
 Sicilian Vespers
 Sicily
 Sicily (theme)
 Sicily, County of
 Sicily, Emirate of
 Sicily, Kingdom of
 Sicily, Muslim conquest of
 Sico of Benevento
 Sico Protospatharios
 Siconulf of Salerno
 Siderokastron
 Siderokausia
 Sigillion
 Sigismund, Holy Roman Emperor
 Sigismund of Burgundy
 Sigizan
 Silk, Byzantine
 Silk Road
 Silver, Byzantine
 Saint Silvia
 Simeon I of Bulgaria
 Simeon Stylites the Younger
 Simeon Stylites, Church of St.
 Simeon Stylites the Younger, Monastery of St.
 Simeon Uroš
 Simmas
 Simonis Palaiologina
 Simon the Athonite
 Simonopetra monastery
 Simplicius of Cilicia
 Sinnion
 Sinope
 Sinope, Siege of
 Sino-Roman relations
 Sirianus
 Sirmium
 Sirmium, Battle of
 Sirmium, Councils of
 Sirmium, Siege of
 Sisauranon
 Sisauranon, Siege of
 Sisinnios Triphyllios
 Sisinnius, Pope of Rome
 Sisinnius I, Archbishop of Constantinople
 Sisinnius II, Patriarch of Constantinople
 Sittas
 Sixth Ecumenical Council
 Skafida, Battle of
 Skande
 Skeuophylax
 Skiathos Castle
 Skleros
 Skopje, Battle of
 Skorta
 Skouterios
 Slavery in the Byzantine Empire
 Slavic migrations to the Balkans
 Smaragdus
 Smbat IV Bagratuni
 Smilets of Bulgaria
 Smiltsena Palaiologina
 Smolyani
 Smyrna
 Smyrna, Metropolis of
 Solachon, Battle of
 Solomon (magister militum)
 Sophia (empress)
 Sophia Eudokia Laskarina
 Sophia of Montferrat
 Sophia Antoniadis
 Sophia Palaiologina
 Sophonias (commentator)
 Sophronius of Jerusalem
 Sopotos
 Soterichos Panteugenos
 Soterioupolis
 Sougdaia
 Soumela Monastery
 Sozopolis, Siege of
 Spania
 Sparta, History of
 Spatharokoubikoularios
 Spear of Destiny
 Spercheios, Battle of
 Speros Vryonis
 Sphrantzes Palaiologos
 Sporacius
 Sporoi
 Spyridon, Church of St., Rhodes
 Staurakios
 Staurakios (eunuch)
 Staurakios Platys
 Stauropolis
 Stauropolis (diocese)
 Stavraton
 Stavronikita monastery
 Stefan Lazarević
 Stefan Nemanja
 Stefan Nemanjić
 Stefan Vojislav
 Stelai, Battle of
 Stenimachos
 Stephanus of Athens
 Stephanus of Byzantium
 Stephen I, Patriarch of Constantinople
 Stephen II of Amasea, Patriarch of Constantinople
 Stephen II of Naples
 Stephen III, Pope of Rome
 Stephen III of Hungary
 Stephen III of Naples
 Stephen IV of Hungary
 Stephen (son of Kalomaria)
 Stephen Držislav of Croatia
 Stephen Dragutin of Serbia
 Stephen du Perche (died 1205)
 Stephen Gabrielopoulos
 Stephen Lekapenos
 Stephen of Alexandria
 Stephen of Ephesus
 Stephen Pateranos
 Stephen the Persian
 Stephen the Younger
 Stephen Uroš IV Dušan of Serbia
 Stephen Uroš V of Serbia
 Stephen Zaccaria
 Stjepan Praska
 Steven Runciman
 Stotzas
 Straits, Battle of the
 Stratarches
 Strategikon of Maurice
 Strategikon of Kekaumenos
 Strategios Podopagouros
 Strategius Apion
 Strategius Musonianus
 Strategos
 Strateia
 Stratelates
 Stratopedarches
 Strator
 Strez
 Strobilos
 Strumica, Battle of
 Strymon (theme)
 Strymonites
 Studies, Byzantine
 Stylianos of Paphlagonia
 Stylianos Zaoutzes
 Subdivisions of the Byzantine Empire
 Suda
 Sufetula, 546/7 Battle of
 Sufetula, 647 Battle of
 Suffragium
 Suintila
 Sulayman ibn Abd al-Malik
 Sulayman ibn Hisham
 Suleiman ibn Qutulmish
 Suleiman II (Rûm)
 Sumbat I of Iberia
 Sunicas
 Surb Karapet Monastery earthquake, 602
 Sutton Hoo
 Sviatoslav I of Kiev
 Sviatoslav's invasion of Bulgaria
 Svindax, Battle of
 Sylloge Tacticorum
 Sylvester Syropoulos
 Symbatios the Armenian
 Symeon Logothete
 Symeon of Trier
 Symeon Stylites of Lesbos
 Symeon the New Theologian
 Symmachus, Pope of Rome
 Symponos
 Synadenos
 Synadene, Queen of Hungary
 Synaxarion of Constantinople
 Syncletica of Alexandria
 Synecdemus
 Synkellos
 Synodianos
 Synodicon Vetus
 Synods of Rome (731)
 Synopsis Chronike (Skoutariotes)
 Syntagma Canonum
 Synthronon
 Syracuse, Sicily
 Syracuse, 827–828 Siege of
 Syracuse, 868 Siege of
 Syracuse, 877–878 Siege of
 Syrgiannes Palaiologos
 Syria (Roman province)
 Syria Prima
 Syria, History of
 Syriac language
 Syro-Roman law book

T

 al-Tabari
 Tablion
 Tabor Light
 Tabula Peutingeriana
 Tactica of Emperor Leo VI the Wise
 Tactica of Nikephoros Ouranos
 Tagaris
 Taginae, Battle of
 Tagma (military)
 Tagmatarchis
 Taktikon Uspensky
Tall el-Hammam
 Tamar of Georgia
 Tamatarcha
 Tamkhosrau
 Tancred, Prince of Galilee
 Tanukhids
 Taormina
 Taormina, 902 Siege of
 Taormina, 962 Siege of
 Taranto
 Tarasius, Patriarch of Constantinople
 Tarchaneiotes
 Taron (historic Armenia)
 Taronites
Tarrach
 Tarsus
 Tatas tes aules
 Tatikios
 Tatzates
 Taurus (consul 428)
 Taurus Mountains
 Taxiarch
 Tayk
 Tedisio Zaccaria
 Teia
 Tekfur
 Tekfur ambarı
 Tekfur Saray
 Telephis–Ollaria, Battle of
 Telerig of Bulgaria
 Teluch
 Templon
 Teodato Ipato
 Tephrike
 Terbounia
 Terentius (comes et dux Armeniae)
 Tervel of Bulgaria
 Tetarteron
 Tetraconch
 Tetrapylon
 Tetrarchy
 Text-type, Byzantine
 Thabit ibn Nasr
 Thamal al-Dulafi
 Thamar Angelina Komnene
 Thannouris
 Thannuris, Battle of
 Thasos
 Thasos, Battle of
 Thebaid
 Thebes, Greece
 Thebes, Metropolis of
 St. Thekla Church, Seleucia
 Thekla, wife of Michael II
 Thekla, daughter of Theophilos
 Thema
 Themistius
 Theocritus (comes domesticorum)
 Theoctistus of Naples
 Theodahad
 Theodora (wife of Justinian I)
 Theodora III Porphyrogenita
 Theodora, wife of Romanos I
 Theodora (wife of Theophilos)
 Theodora, daughter of Constantine VII
 Theodora Angelina, Duchess of Austria
 Theodora Axouchina
 Theodora of Trebizond
 Theodora Kantakouzene
 Theodora Kantakouzene, wife of Alexios IV of Trebizond
 Theodora Kantakouzene, wife of Orhan
 Theodora Komnene, Duchess of Austria
 Theodora Komnene, Princess of Antioch
 Theodora Komnene, Queen of Jerusalem
 Theodora Komnene (daughter of Alexios I)
 Theodora of Alexandria
 Theodora of Arta
 Theodora of Khazaria
 Theodora Palaiologina (Byzantine empress)
 Theodora Palaiologina, Empress of Bulgaria
 Theodora Palaiologina Synadene
 Theodora Raoulaina
 Theodora Tocco
 Theodore (brother of Heraclius)
 Theodore I Calliopas
 Theodore I Laskaris
 Theodore I of Naples
 Theodore I Palaiologos
 Theodore I, Marquess of Montferrat
 Theodore I, Patriarch of Constantinople
 Theodore I, Pope of Rome
 Theodore II (exarch)
 Theodore II Laskaris
 Theodore II Palaiologos
 Theodore II Eirenikos, Patriarch of Constantinople
 Theodore Aaronios
 Theodore Abu-Qurrah
 Theodore Alyates
 Theodore Angelos
 Theodore Balsamon
 Theodore Branas
 Theodore Daphnopates
 Theodore Gabras
 Theodore Hyrtakenos
 Theodore Kantakouzenos
 Theodore Kastamonites
 Theodore Komnenos Doukas
 Theodore Mangaphas
 Theodore Meliteniotes
 Theodore Metochites
 Theodore Mouzalon
 Theodore of Dekapolis
 Theodore of Mopsuestia
 Theodore of Raithu
 Theodore of Sykeon
 Theodore Palaiologos (16th century)
 Theodore Palaiologos (son of Michael VIII)
 Theodore Parsakoutenos
 Theodore Philes
 Theodore Pileles Doranites
 Theodore Prodromos
 Theodore Rshtuni
 Theodore Synkellos
 Theodore the Studite
 Theodore Styppeiotes
 Theodore Svetoslav of Bulgaria
 Theodore Synadenos
 Theodore of Dobruja
 Theodore of Tarsus
 Theodore Trithyrius
 Theodore Vatatzes
 Theodorias (province)
 Theodoric Strabo
 Theodoric the Great
 Theodorokanos
 Theodorus and Theophanes
 Theodorus Lector
 Theodosia, wife of Leo V
 Theodosian dynasty
 Theodosian Walls
 Theodosiopolis (Armenia)
 Theodosios Monomachos
 Theodosius I
 Theodosius I Borradiotes, Patriarch of Constantinople
 Theodosius I, Coptic Patriarch of Alexandria
 Theodosius II
 Theodosius III
 Theodosius III of Abkhazia
 Theodosius (son of Maurice)
 Theodosius the Cenobiarch
 Theodosius Cistern
 Theodosius the Deacon
 Theodosius the Elder
 Theodosius, Forum of
 Theodote
 Theodotos Kalothetos
 Theodotus I Kassiteras, Patriarch of Constantinople
 Theodotus II, Patriarch of Constantinople
 Theodoulos Parsakoutenos
 Theodulf of Orléans
 Theoktiste
 Theoktiste (740–802)
 Theoktiste of Lesbos
 Theoktistos
 Theoktistos (magistros)
 Theoktistos Bryennios
 Theoleptos of Philadelphia
 Theopaschites
 Theophanes (chamberlain)
 Theophanes Continuatus
 Theophanes Nonnus
 Theophanes of Byzantium
 Theophanes the Branded
 Theophanes the Confessor
 Theophanes the Greek
 Theophano, wife of Staurakios
 Theophano, wife of Leo VI
 Theophano (born Anastaso)
 Theophanu
 Theophanu, Cultural depictions of
 Theophilos (emperor)
 Theophilos Erotikos
 Theophilos Erotikos (10th century)
 Theophilos Kourkouas
 Theophilos Palaiologos
 Theophilus of Adana
 Theophilus Antecessor
 Theophilus Protospatharius
 Theophobos
 Theophylact (son of Michael I)
 Theophylact Botaneiates
 Theophylact Dalassenos
 Theophylact Rhangabe
 Theophylact of Nicomedia
 Theophylact Simocatta
 Theophylact Lekapenos, Patriarch of Constantinople
 Theophylactus (exarch)
 Theotokos
 Theotokos Euergetis Monastery
 Theotokos Kosmosoteira
 Thermantia
 Thessalonica
 Thessalonica (theme)
 Thessalonica, King of
 Thessalonica, Kingdom of
 Thessalonica, 617 Siege of
 Thessalonica, 676–678 Siege of
 Thessalonica, 904 Sack of
 Thessalonica, 995 Battle of
 Thessalonica, 1004 Battle of
 Thessalonica, 1014 Battle of
 Thessalonica, 1040 Battle of
 Thessalonica, 2nd 1040 Battle of
 Thessalonica, Empire of
 Thessalonica, 1185 Sack of
 Thessalonica, 1422–1430 Siege of
 Thessalonica, Walls of
 Thessaly
 Thessaly, History of
 Theudebert I
 Third Crusade
 Thomais Orsini
 Thomas I, Patriarch of Constantinople
 Thomas I Komnenos Doukas
 Thomas II, Patriarch of Constantinople
 Thomas II Preljubović
 Thomas Asen Palaiologos
 Thomas Kantakouzenos
 Thomas Morosini
 Thomas Palaiologos
 Thomas the Slav
 Thoros of Edessa
 Thoros I, Prince of Armenia
 Thoros II, Prince of Armenia
 Thracia (Roman province)
 Thracian Goths
Thracian religion
 Thrace
 Thrace (theme)
 Thrace, Diocese of
 Thracesian Theme
Thracians
 Thrasamund
 Thrasimund II of Spoleto
 Three-Chapter Controversy
 Three Treatises on Imperial Military Expeditions
 Throne of Maximian
 Thumama ibn al-Walid
 Thurisind
 Thyatira
 Tiberias
 Tiberiopolis
 Tiberius II Constantine
 Tiberius III
 Tiberius (son of Constans II)
 Tiberius (son of Justinian II)
 Tiberius (son of Maurice)
 Tiberius Petasius
 Tihomir (Bulgarian noble)
 Tihomir of Serbia
 Timarion
 Time, Byzantine
 Timothy I, Patriarch of Constantinople
 Timothy III (IV), Coptic Patriarch of Alexandria
 Timothy of Constantinople
 Timur
 Titiopolis
 Tocco family
 Tocco, Chronicle of the
 Toklu Dede Mosque
Tomb of Jesus
 Tomislav of Croatia
 Tondrakites
 Toparches
 Topoteretes
 Tornikios
 Totila
 Toupha
 Tourkia, Metropolitanate of
 Tourkopouloi
 Tourma
 Trachy (currency)
 Trajanopolis
 Trajan's Gate, Battle of
 Tralleis
 Transfiguration Monastery, Kinaliada
 Trapezuntine Civil War
 Trasilla and Emiliana
 Trebizond
 Trebizond, Empire of
 Trebizond, 1205–1206 Siege of
 Trebizond, 1222–1223 Siege of
 Trebizond, 1282 Siege of
 Trebizond, 1282 Byzantine Treaty with
 Trebizond, 1461 Siege of
 Trebizond Gospel
 Tremissis
 Triarius
 Tribigild
 Tribonian
 Tricamarum, Battle of
 Trikala Castle
 Triptych
 Trisagion
 Triumph of Orthodoxy
 Triumph of Orthodoxy, Icon of the
 Trocundes, Flavius Appalius Illus
 Troia, Apulia
 Troyes Casket
 True Cross
 Tryavna, Battle of
 Tryphon, Patriarch of Constantinople
 Tsargrad
 Tsebelda fortress
 Tughj ibn Juff
 Tulunids
 Tur Abdin
 Turahan Bey
 Turahanoğlu Ömer Bey
 Turgun
 Turkey
 Turkic peoples
 Twenty Years' Anarchy
 Tyana
 Tyana, Siege of
 Tymandus
 Typikon
 Tyre, 996–998 Revolt of
 Tzachas
 Tzangion
 Tzanichites
 Tzaousios
 Tzath II of Lazica
 Tzazo
 Tzepaina
 Tzitzak
 Tzykanisterion
 Tzympe

U

 Ubayd Allah ibn Marwan
 Üçayak Byzantine Church 
 Ujayf ibn Anbasa
 Uldach
 Ulfilas
 Umar
 Umar II
 Umar al-Aqta
 Umayr ibn al-Hubab al-Sulami
 Umar ibn Hubayra
 Umar ibn al-Walid
 Umayyad Caliphate
 Umm el-Jimal
 Umur Beg
 Units of measurement, Byzantine
 University, Byzantine
 University of Constantinople
 Unknown Archont
 Upper Zohar
 Uqba ibn Nafi
Urbicius (eunuch)
 Urbinus, Siege of
 Uroš I, Grand Prince of Serbia
 Uroš II, Grand Prince of Serbia
 Ursicinus (magister equitum)
 Ursus (praefectus urbi)
 Ursus of Benevento
 Urviventus, Siege of
 Usdibad
 Uthman ibn Affan
 Utigurs
 Utus, Battle of the

V

 Vagenetia
 Vahan (Byzantine commander)
 Vahram Pahlavouni
 Vakhtang I of Iberia
 Valaris
 Valens
 Aqueduct of Valens
 Valentinianic dynasty
 Valentinian I
 Valentinian II
 Valentinian III
 Valentinus (usurper)
 Valeria Maximilla
 Valoi, House of
 Valona, Principality of
 Vandal Sardinia
 Vandalic War
 Vandals
 Varangian Guard
 Varangians
 Varaztirots II Bagratuni
 Vardan II
 Vatatzes
 Vasilissa ergo gaude
 Vatopedi monastery
 Vazelon Monastery
 Vefa Kilise Mosque
 Velestino
 Veligosti, Barony of
Venance Grumel
 Vendemianus of Bithynia
Venetikà
 Venice
 Venice, Maritime
 Venice, Republic of
 Venice, 1082 Byzantine treaty with
 Venice, 1171–1172 Byzantine war with
 Venice, 1219 Nicaean treaty with
 Venice, 1268 Byzantine treaty with
 Venice, 1277 Byzantine treaty with
 Venice, 1296–1302 Byzantine war with
 Vera von Falkenhausen
 Verina
 Verinopolis
 Veroli Casket
 Verona, Siege of
 Versinikia, Battle of
 Vesaina
 Vescera, Battle of
 Vestarches
 Vestes
 Vestiarion
 Vestiaritai
 Vestitor
 Vetranio
 Vettius Agorius Basilius Mavortius
 Victor of Tunnuna
 Vigilantia
 Viking
 Vir gloriosus
 Virgin of the Pharos, Church of
 Višeslav of Serbia
 Visigoths
 Vistahm
 Vitalian (consul)
 Vitalian, Pope of Rome
Vitalien Laurent
 Vitiges
 Vivianus, Flavius Antoninus Messala
 Vladimir I of Kiev
 Vladislaus II, Duke of Bohemia
 Vladimir II of Duklja
 Vlastimir
 Vlatades Monastery
 Vodena
 Vojihna
 Vojislav of Duklja
 Volturnus, 554 Battle of
 Vostitsa, Barony of
 Vranas
 Vukan, Grand Prince of Serbia
 Vukašin Mrnjavčević

W

 Al-Walid I
 Al-Walid II
 Al-Walid ibn Hisham al-Mu'ayti
 Wallachia
 Walled Obelisk
 Walls of Constantinople
 Walter Kaegi
 Warren Treadgold
 Al-Wathiq
 Weh Antiok Khosrow
 Wernher Triptych
 Western Roman Empire
William Grassus
 William II of Sicily
 William II of Villehardouin
 William of Champlitte
 William Miller (historian)
 Wolfgang Müller-Wiener
 Women in the Byzantine Empire
 Worcester Hunt Mosaic
 Worms, 868 Synod of

X

 Xantheia
 Xenophontos monastery
 Xeropotamou Monastery
 Xerxes (Sasanian prince)
 Xiphilinos
 Xyniae

Y

 Yahya of Antioch
 Yanıkhan
 Yanis Kordatos
 Ya'qub ibn Ishaq al-Tamimi
 Yaqub Spata
 Yarmouk, Battle of
 Yaroslav I the Wise
 Yazaman al-Khadim
 Yazdegerd I
 Yazdegerd II
 Yazdegerd III
 Yazid I
 Yazid II
 Yazid ibn Abi Kabsha al-Saksaki
 Yazid ibn Asid ibn Zafir al-Sulami
 Yeni Cuma Mosque
 Yolanda of Flanders
 Yusuf ibn Umar ibn Shu'ayb

Z

 Zabergan
 Zaccaria
 Zacharias Rhetor
 Zachary, Pope of Rome
 Zachlumia
 Zadar
 Zagore
 Zaharija of Serbia
 Al-Zahir li-i'zaz Din Allah
 Zakynthos
 Zaliche
Zampia Palaiologina
 Zealots of Thessalonica
 Zelve Monastery
 Zemarchus
 Zemun
 Zenevisi family
 Zeno (consul 448)
 Zeno (emperor)
 Zenobia
 Zenonis
 Zenopolis (Isauria)
 Zenopolis, Lycia or Pamphylia
 Zenopolis, Phoenicia
 Zeon (liturgy)
 Zerzevan Castle
 Zeta (crown land)
 Zetounion
 Zeugaratikion
 Zeugaratos
  Zeuxippus, Baths of
 Zeyrek Mosque
 Zichia
 Zikideva
 Zilgibis
 Zlatostruj
 Zoe Zaoutzaina
 Zoe Karbonopsina
 Zoe Porphyrogenita
 Zograf Monastery
 Zoilus, Patriarch of Alexandria
 Zoodochos Pigi Church, Dervenosalesi
 Zosimas of Palestine
 Zosimus
 Zoste patrikia
 Zuhayr ibn Qays
 Zvečan, Battle of
 Zygos Pass, Battle of
 Zygostates (Byzantine official)

Lists

 Archbishops of the Archbishopric of Ohrid
 Bulgarian monarchs
 Byzantine emperors
 Byzantine emperors of Armenian origin
 Byzantine battles
 Byzantine composers
 Byzantine foreign treaties
 Byzantine inventions
 Byzantine monuments in Istanbul
 Byzantine revolts and civil wars
 Byzantine scholars
 Byzantine usurpers
 Byzantine wars
 Consorts of the Byzantine successor states
 Dukes of Naples
 Ecumenical Patriarchs of Constantinople
 Emperors of Trebizond
 Greek Orthodox Patriarchs of Antioch
 Leaders during the Byzantine Papacy
 Massacres in the Byzantine Empire
 Patriarchs of Alexandria
 People from Constantinople
 Roman and Byzantine Empresses
 Sieges of Constantinople
 States during Late Antiquity
 Urban prefects of Constantinople
 Urban prefects of Rome

Categories
:Category:Byzantine Empire

See also

 Outline of the Byzantine Empire
 Index of Sasanian Empire–related articles

Byzantine Empire
Byzantine Empire